= Nibujón =

- Village
- Location of Nibujón in Cuba
- Coordinates: 20°30′28.5″N 74°39′06.1″W
- Country: Cuba
- Province: Guantánamo
- Municipality: Baracoa
- Elevation: 10 m (33 ft)

Population (2011)
  - Total: 3,135
- Time zone: UTC-5 (EST)
- Area code: +53-21

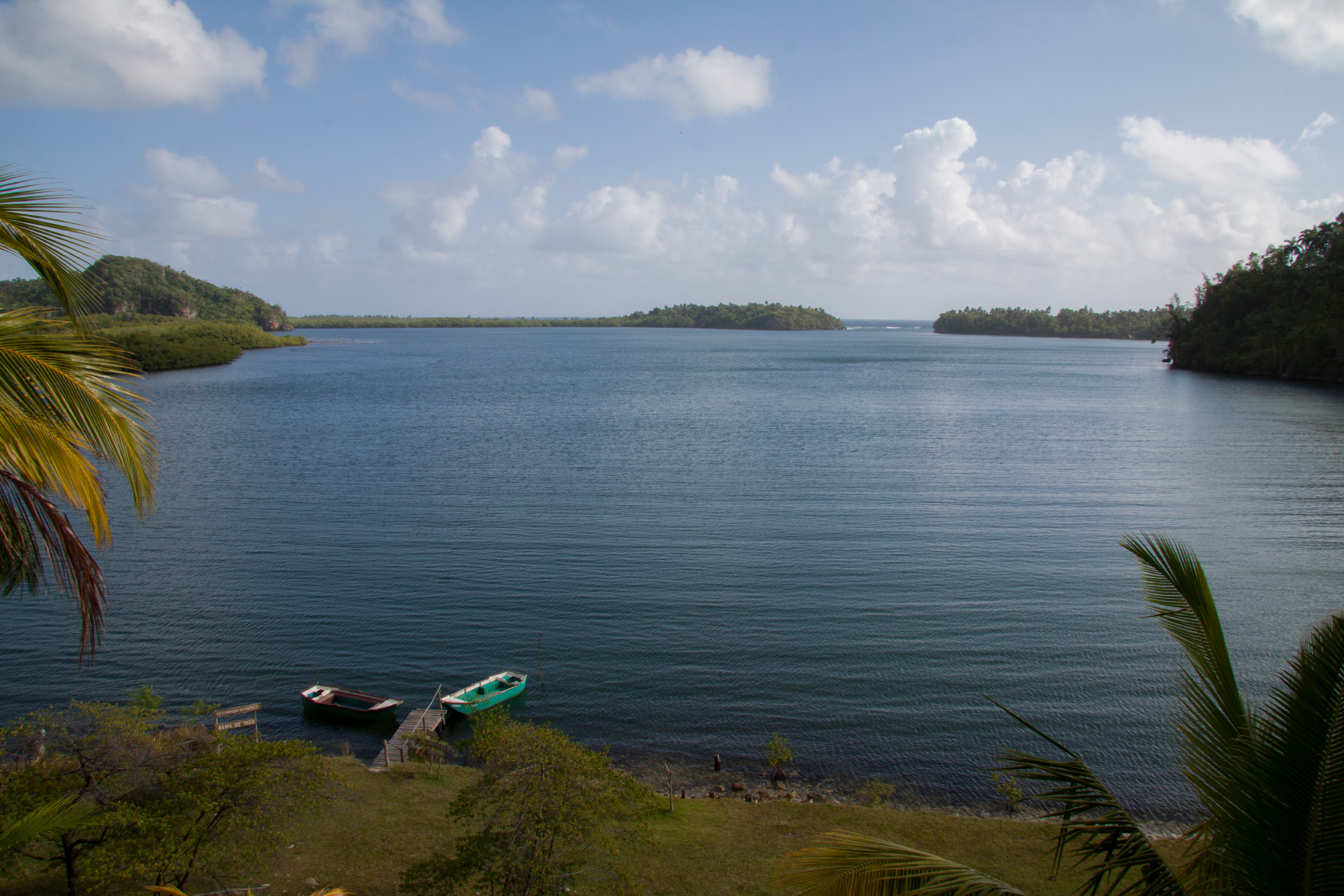
Another view of Taco Bay

Nibujón is a Cuban village and consejo popular ("people's council", i.e. hamlet) of the municipality of Baracoa, in Guantánamo Province. In 2011 it had a population of 3,135.

== History ==
In origins, the village was a scarcely populated rural area, with a population of 1,968 in 1943. that was organized and officially founded as consejo popular of Baracoa municipality, in 1992.

== Geography ==
Located on the Atlantic Coast, in the eastern edge of the Alejandro de Humboldt National Park, Nibujón spans between two bays (Taco Bay to the north, and a little one to the south), along the "Circuito Norte" highway (CN). Nibujón River flows in the middle of the settlement, that counts two main beaches: Playa Pinca (north) and Playa Nibujón (south).

The village lies between the towns of Moa (43 km north) and Baracoa (31 km south), and the nearest settlements to it are Yamanigüey (17 km north), Cayogüín (18 km south), and the small localities of Vega de Taco (3 km), Santa María (7 km) and Jaragua (8 km). Nibujón is also close to the Nipe-Sagua-Baracoa, a mountain range that occupies the provincial territories of Holguín and Guantánamo.

== Nature ==
The natural environment surrounding Nibujón is one of the habitats of the Monte Iberia eleuth (Eleutherodactylus iberia), a Cuban endemic frog.

== Personalities ==
- Bienvenido Breffe Maceo (1938–1964), revolutionary

== See also ==
- Municipalities of Cuba
- List of cities in Cuba
