= Addys Mercedes =

Cuban pop and world music singer

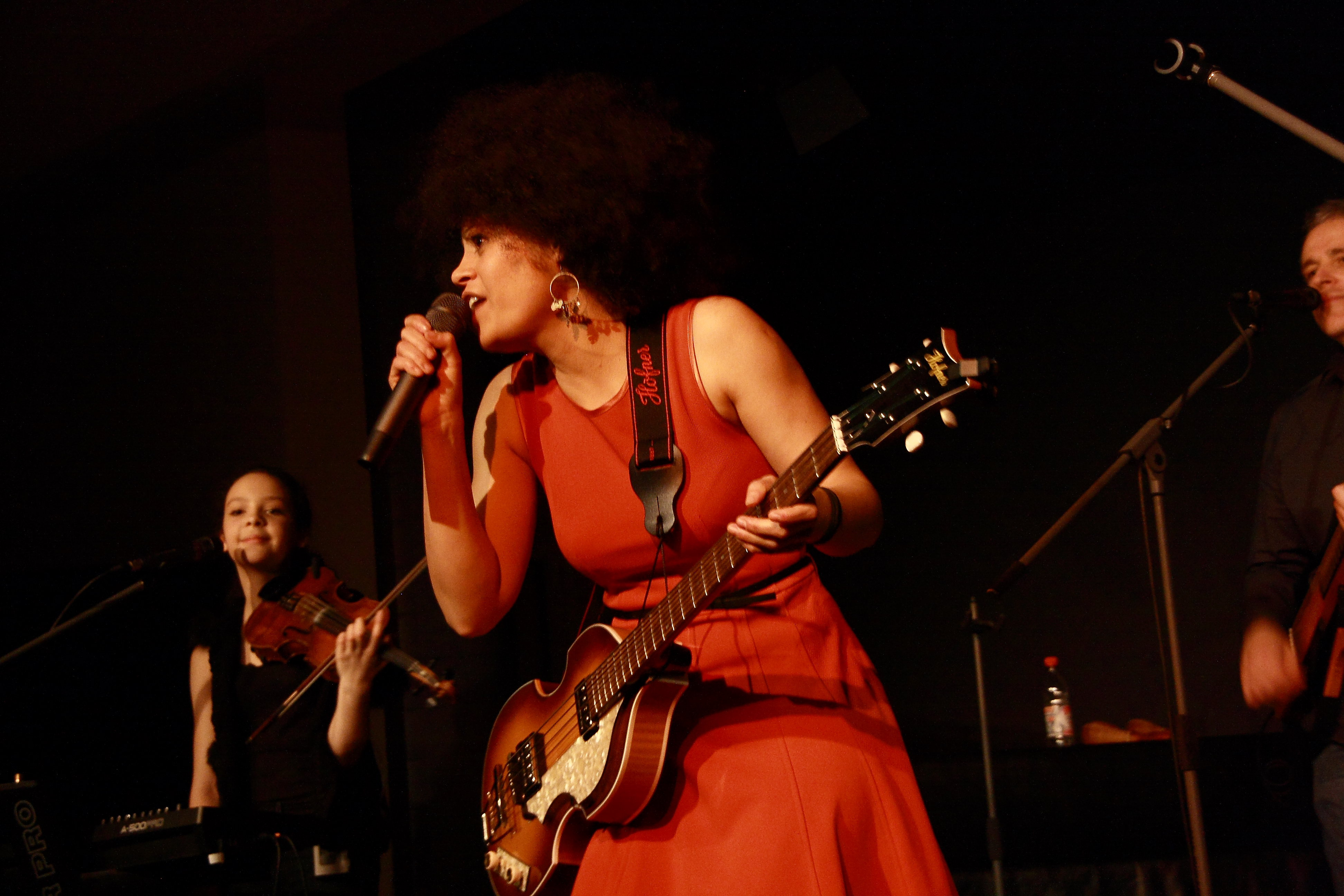
Addys Mercedes with Lia at KULT, Niederstetten, 2013

Addys Mercedes (Spanish pronunciation: [ˈaðis meɾˈseðes], formerly known as Addys D'Mercedes) is a Cuban pop and world music singer living in Germany and Spain.

She made her UK debut in 2001 at the Guildford Festival and since then has undertaken two British tours.

== Early life ==
Addys was born in 1973 in Moa, a city in the east of Holguín Province. At the age of 10, she had learnt a vast repertoire – from Cuban songs to boleros, Mexican rancheras to American pop-songs.

At the age of 15, Addys started performing with her first professional band Timbre Latino. Shortly thereafter, she was asked by the nationally successful band "Los Neiras" to join them.

At the age of 18, Addys became part of a newly founded band with a daily gig in the tourist area Guardalavaca. During the periodo especial, when food was difficult to obtain, this was the gig every musician was dreaming of. She had a room in the hotel and was fully catered. With the fee and tips she made, she was able to support her family.

In 1993, Addys was invited to Germany and quickly learned German. She founded her first trio and began writing her own songs. She regularly visited her family in Cuba but also absorbed the new influences of her new home.

== Musical career ==
In 1999, she moved to Düsseldorf and was signed by the label Media Luna. She began the production of her debut album which was mainly recorded in Havana with musician friends from her hometown. Raúl Planas was a special guest on the recording.

Mundo Nuevo was released in 2001 by the label Media Luna (Warner) and became a huge success in European media.

In 2003, Addys released her second album, Nomad (Media Luna / Sony), recorded in Germany and Barcelona and mixed her Cuban roots with electronic elements. She performed in many concerts and toured in 16 European countries, sharing stages with artists like Eric Clapton, Bob Geldof, Mike Rutherford, Gary Brooker, Ringo Starr, Juan Luis Guerra, Compay Segundo and Tito Nieves.

Singles and video clips were made for her songs Mundo Nuevo, Gitana Loca and Esa Voz. In addition to the albums produced by Cae Davis, her label Media Luna released several remixes from DJs Andry Nalin (Afro D'Mercedes), Ramon Zenker (Cha Ka Cha), Tony Brown (Mundo Nuevo), Guido Craveiro (Cry It Out) and 4tune Twins (Oye Colombia)

From 2005 to 2011, Addys lived in Germany and the Canarian island of Tenerife. In Spain she frequently appeared on TV and performed on national TV-stations like Antena3, Tele5, MTV and other local stations.

Since 2011, Addys has been living in Essen, Germany. That May, her new single Sabado Roto was released. Produced by Cae Davis and Pomez di Lorenzo (Sasha, Dick Brave), Sabado Roto is the first single out of the third album Addys released in 2012. Different from her last Album Nomad, electronic elements completely disappeared. Accompanied by mandolins, ukuleles and a Cuban tres, Addys sings of a rainy Saturday in summer, a Sabado Roto (broken Saturday).

In addition to shows with her band, Addys started a Trio with Pomez di Lorenzo (guitar) and Cae Davis (bass) under the name En Casa de Addys. In it, Addys provides vocals and also plays guitar, cajon and Cuban percussion instruments such as maracas, guiro and claves. During her 2-month spring tour in 2012 she was accompanied by her daughter Lia on violin, who was a junior student at Folkwang University.

== Discography ==
=== Albums ===
- Mundo Nuevo (2001 Media Luna)
- Nomad (2003 Media Luna)
- Addys (2012 Media Luna)
- Extraño (2016 Media Luna)

=== Singles ===
- Mundo Nuevo (2001 Media Luna)
- Gitana Loca (2005 Media Luna)
- Esa Voz (2005 Media Luna)
- Sabado Roto (2011 Media Luna)
- Hollywood (2012 Media Luna)
- Gigolo (2012 Media Luna)
- Rompe el Caracol (2014 Media Luna)

== See also ==
- List of Cubans
