= Hurricane Noel =

Category 1 Atlantic hurricane in 2007

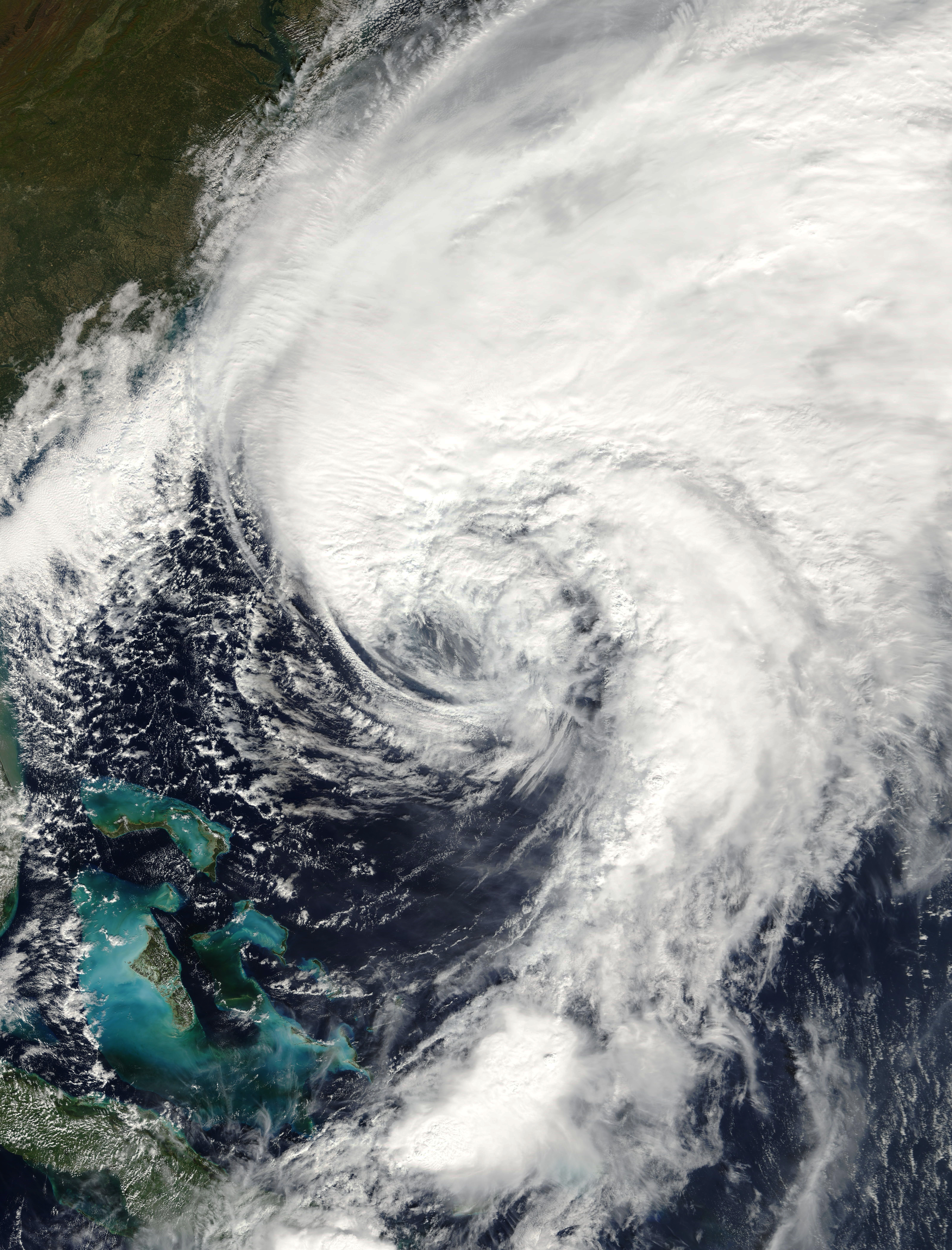
- Hurricane Noel near peak intensity north of the Bahamas, while undergoing extratropical transition, on November 2

Meteorological history
- Formed: October 28, 2007
- Extratropical: November 2, 2007
- Dissipated: November 7, 2007

Category 1 hurricane
- 1-minute sustained (SSHWS/NWS)
- Highest winds: 80 mph (130 km/h)
- Lowest pressure: 980 mbar (hPa); 28.94 inHg

Overall effects
- Fatalities: 223 total
- Damage: $580 million (2007 USD)
- Areas affected: Leeward Islands, Puerto Rico, Hispaniola, Jamaica, Cuba, Turks and Caicos Islands, Bahamas, Florida, Eastern United States, Eastern Canada, Greenland, Western Europe
- IBTrACS
- Part of the 2007 Atlantic hurricane season

Hurricane Noel was a deadly tropical cyclone that moved across the Atlantic Ocean from the Caribbean Sea to Newfoundland in late October 2007. The sixteenth tropical depression, fourteenth named storm, and the sixth hurricane of the 2007 Atlantic hurricane season, Noel formed on October 27 from the interaction between a tropical wave and an upper-level low in the north-central Caribbean. It strengthened to winds of 60 mph (97 km/h) before making landfall on western Haiti and the north coast of eastern Cuba. Noel turned northward, and on November 1, it attained hurricane status. The hurricane accelerated northeastward after crossing the Bahamas, and on November 2, it transitioned into an extratropical cyclone. (The Canadian Hurricane Centre classified Noel as a "post-tropical storm" until 2200 UTC on November 4, when the CHC determined that Noel had lost all tropical characteristics.)

The storm caused at least 163 direct deaths along its path, primarily in Dominican Republic and Haiti, due to flooding and mudslides. It was the deadliest North Atlantic hurricane of the 2007 hurricane season. After its extratropical transition, Noel became a very strong low pressure system, causing flooding and wind damage over Maine and Eastern Canada, with heavy rainfall occurring across Atlantic Canada, and snowfall over some areas of Eastern Quebec and Labrador. Noel's remnants subsequently merged with Cyclone Tilo, a powerful European windstorm, which later struck Western Europe and contributed to the North Sea flood of 2007 on the night of November 8–9.

== Meteorological history ==
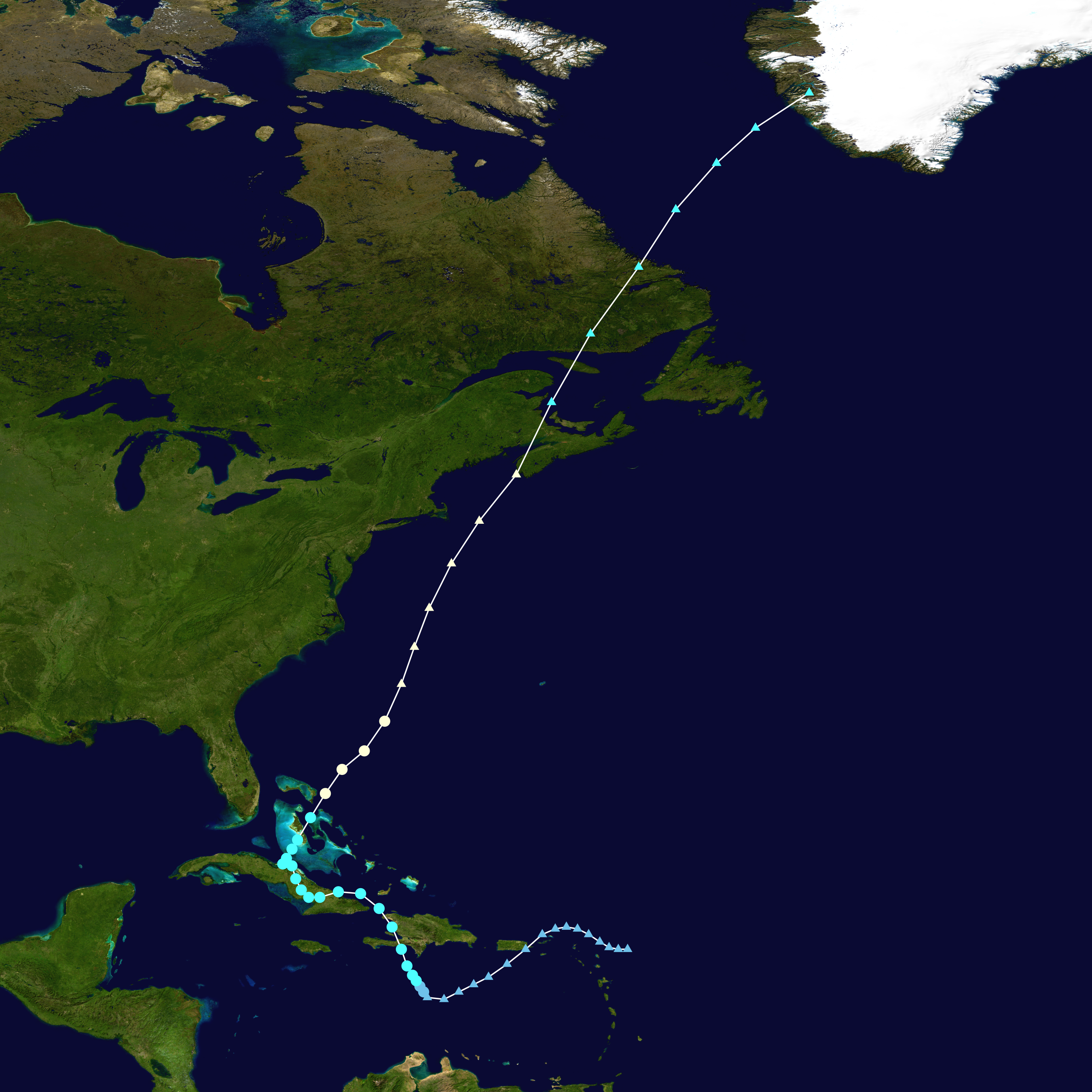
Map plotting the storm's track and intensity, according to the Saffir–Simpson scale Map key Saffir–Simpson scale Tropical depression (≤38 mph, ≤62 km/h) Tropical storm (39–73 mph, 63–118 km/h) Category 1 (74–95 mph, 119–153 km/h) Category 2 (96–110 mph, 154–177 km/h) Category 3 (111–129 mph, 178–208 km/h) Category 4 (130–156 mph, 209–251 km/h) Category 5 (≥157 mph, ≥252 km/h) Unknown Storm type Tropical cyclone Subtropical cyclone Extratropical cyclone, remnant low, tropical disturbance, or monsoon depression

A tropical wave exited the coast of Africa on October 16. It tracked westward, initially without organization, and by October 22 was interacting with a trough while approaching the Lesser Antilles. This caused a low-pressure area to develop on October 23 about 175 mi (282 km) east-northeast of the northern Lesser Antilles. The system continued westward with disorganized convection, and was unable to develop further due to strong wind shear. Despite the shear, convection increased as barometric pressures dropped in association with the organizing system. Turning west-southwestward, the low passed over the United States Virgin Islands on October 25 and just southeast of Puerto Rico the next day. Decreasing wind shear on October 27 allowed the thunderstorms to increase over the center late on October 27. After further organization, the system developed into Tropical Depression Sixteen at 0000 UTC on October 28, about 215 mi (346 km) south-southeast of Port-au-Prince, Haiti. Initially, the National Hurricane Center (NHC) forecast the depression to track west-northwestward, brushing southwestern Haiti before moving ashore along south-central Cuba.

Upon becoming a tropical cyclone, the tropical depression was moving to the west-northwest, under the steering currents of a high pressure area over the western Atlantic Ocean. Six hours after formation, the center of the storm became difficult to locate, though subsequently the tropical depression became much better organized; a large area of convection developed over the center, with several rainbands to its south. Based on reports from Hurricane Hunters, the National Hurricane Center upgraded the depression to Tropical Storm Noel at 1815 UTC on October 28, while located about 150 miles (240 km) south-southeast of Port-au-Prince, Haiti. After the center re-developed beneath the thunderstorms, the storm quickly strengthened to winds of 60 mph (97 km/h), and for several hours, the cyclone was drifting to the south of Hispaniola. Noel began to lose organization as a nearby upper-level low increased wind shear, with the circulation becoming ill-defined, as it further interacted with the mountainous terrain of Haiti. The storm crossed western Haiti as a disorganized tropical storm on October 29, and subsequently began moving parallel to the northeastern coast of Cuba, while moving around the southwestern periphery of a weakening ridge. On October 30, Noel made landfall near Gibara, Cuba, with winds of about 60 mph (97 km/h).

The center of Noel remained well-organized as it tracked through eastern Cuba, though its sustained winds quickly diminished to minimal tropical storm force. Early on October 31, Noel began drifting to the north-northwest, in response to the approach of a short-wave trough from the west and the eastward shift of the mid-level ridge. A large area of strong convective rainbands persisted to its east, though due to increased upper-level wind shear, there was little convection near the center. Shortly after 1200 UTC, on October 31, Noel emerged off the north coast of Cuba, and subsequently, the cyclone became better organized as storm's the circulation became better associated with the convection. While located just off the north coast of Cuba, the motion of Noel was nearly stationary, though forecasters indicated it could have executed a small cyclonic loop. On October 31, the Canadian Hurricane Centre began tracking the storm.

Convection increased early on November 1, though initially the center remained to the southwest of the large area of thunderstorms. At 1800 UTC that day, the storm passed over the Bahamian island of New Providence near the city of Nassau. Later that day, the center tracked beneath the convection, and Noel accelerated northeastward, in the southwesterly flow ahead of an approaching trough; as it did so, the center became elongated and distorted. The cyclone maintained a large, round area of deep convection with well-defined outflow, and an eye feature became evident on satellite imagery. Based on reports from Hurricane Hunters, the National Hurricane Center upgraded Noel to hurricane status early on November 2, about 180 miles (290 km) north-northeast of Nassau, Bahamas. Noel's convection began to wane as it moved through progressively cooler waters, and as the storm lost tropical characteristics, its wind field expanded. By late on November 2, the inner core had substantially diminished, and the thermodynamic structure of the cyclone had become asymmetrical and frontal. As Noel began transitioning into an extratropical cyclone, the National Hurricane Center issued their final advisory on Hurricane Noel.

Early on November 3, Noel's extratropical remnant attained winds of 85 mph (137 km/h), and it gradually turned to the north-northeast. As the center of Noel approached Nova Scotia, its large circulation produced strong winds across all of Atlantic Canada and New England, and on November 4, the storm tracked across Nova Scotia and New Brunswick.

At 6 PM AST (2200 UTC) on November 4, as the storm was over Labrador, the Canadian Hurricane Center declared that Noel had lost all tropical characteristics and changed its designation from post-tropical to extratropical. The extratropical low continued to the northeast and made landfall over southwest Greenland on the afternoon of November 5, bringing tropical storm force winds to the area. Noel's circulation dissipated over Greenland later that night. While its lowest barometric pressure as a tropical system was 980 mb, on November 4, while located near Labrador, it registered a minimum pressure of 966 mb.

Noel's remnants subsequently turned east and crossed the Atlantic Ocean, before merging into the powerful European windstorm Cyclone Tilo, over the Norwegian Sea, on November 7.

== Preparations ==
=== Caribbean ===
Tropical Storm Noel nearing Hispaniola on October 28

The San Juan National Weather Service issued widespread flood and flash flood warnings and watches across Puerto Rico. Due to unsettled conditions, officials advised residents to stay out of harm's way and off the roadways. A flash flood warning was issued for the entirety of the United States Virgin Islands.

Upon being classified as a tropical cyclone, the government of Haiti issued a tropical storm warning for the southwestern peninsula from its border with the Dominican Republic westward to Port-au-Prince. By the time Noel made landfall on Haiti, a tropical storm warning was either recommended or put in place for the southern coast of Hispaniola from Barahona, Dominican Republic, to Port-au-Prince, Haiti. In Haiti, Health care centers were advised to activate any emergency plans, and medicine stocks were pre-positioned if needed. Residents in flood-prone areas were evacuated. In the departments of Sud-Est, Sud, Grand'Anse, Nippes, Ouest, Centre and Artibonie, a red alert was issued, while an orange alert was issued for Nord-Est, Nord and Nord-Ouest. In the Dominican Republic, 14,500 people sought protection in shelters. About 1,000 inmates were evacuated from a prison north of the country's capital city. The National Emergency Commission authorized the opening of a number of shelters, and the Dominican Red Cross activated search and rescue teams. The Coordination Centre set up a "crisis room", assigning workers to 24-hour shifts.

A hurricane watch was issued for southeastern Cuba; a tropical storm warning was in effect for the southeastern Bahamas, including the Turks and Caicos Islands, and a tropical storm watch was put in place for the central Bahamas. A tropical storm warning was also issued for the northwestern Bahamas. There, most government offices were closed during the passage of the storm. On the island of Andros, residents took extra care in securing their boats. As the storm tracked further to the northwest, a tropical storm warning was put in place for the Cuban provinces of Guantánamo, Holguín, Las Tunas, Ciego de Ávila, and Camagüey. The Cuban Institute of Meteorology advised caution to residents, due to previous heavy rainfall leaving grounds saturated. Several schools were closed during the storm's onslaught. In Camagüey, thousands of cattle were moved to higher ground, and roughly 3,000 students working to harvest coffee crops were forced to return home. A United States Naval base in Guantanamo Bay stacked sandbags to protect structures in areas vulnerable to flooding, namely those in low-lying terrain.

=== United States and Canada ===
Late on October 31, the National Hurricane Center issued a tropical storm watch for southeastern Florida, as tropical storm force winds were expected to come close to the coastline. Coastal flood warnings, high surf advisories, and high wind warnings were posted for the coastline of Florida, North Carolina, and South Carolina as Noel churned offshore in the Atlantic. Similar advisories were placed into effect from Virginia Beach, Virginia to Ocean City, Maryland. A coastal flood watch was issued for parts of New York, including Long Island. As the extratropical storm progressed north, wind advisories were posted along the coast of New England, and a winter storm watch was issued for northern Maine. The Cape Cod and Islands division of the Red Cross opened a number of shelters on Nantucket and along coastal Massachusetts. Stores on Cape Cod were closed; some of them boarded up windows, and the U.S. Coast Guard completed preparations and warned sailors of the storm.

Prior to the arrival of Noel into Atlantic Canada, heavy rain and strong wind warnings were put in place for many locations in southeastern Canada. The Canadian Hurricane Centre issued hurricane-force wind warnings for waters to the southwest of the Maritimes and gale warnings for waters elsewhere off of southeastern Canada. The Halifax and Montreal Storm Prediction Centers of the Meteorological Service of Canada issued high winds and heavy rain warning for all the areas of the Maritimes, Newfoundland, Labrador and Eastern Quebec, as well as heavy snow warnings for certain regions. Air Canada canceled 13 of their flights in and out of Halifax. Throughout Nova Scotia, 500 Red Cross volunteers were put on standby.

== Impact ==
Deaths by area
| Area | Deaths |
|---|---|
| Bahamas | 1 |
| Cuba | 1 |
| Dominican Republic | 129 |
| Haiti | 90 |
| Jamaica | 1 |
| Canada | 1 |
| Total | 223 |

=== Lesser Antilles and Puerto Rico ===
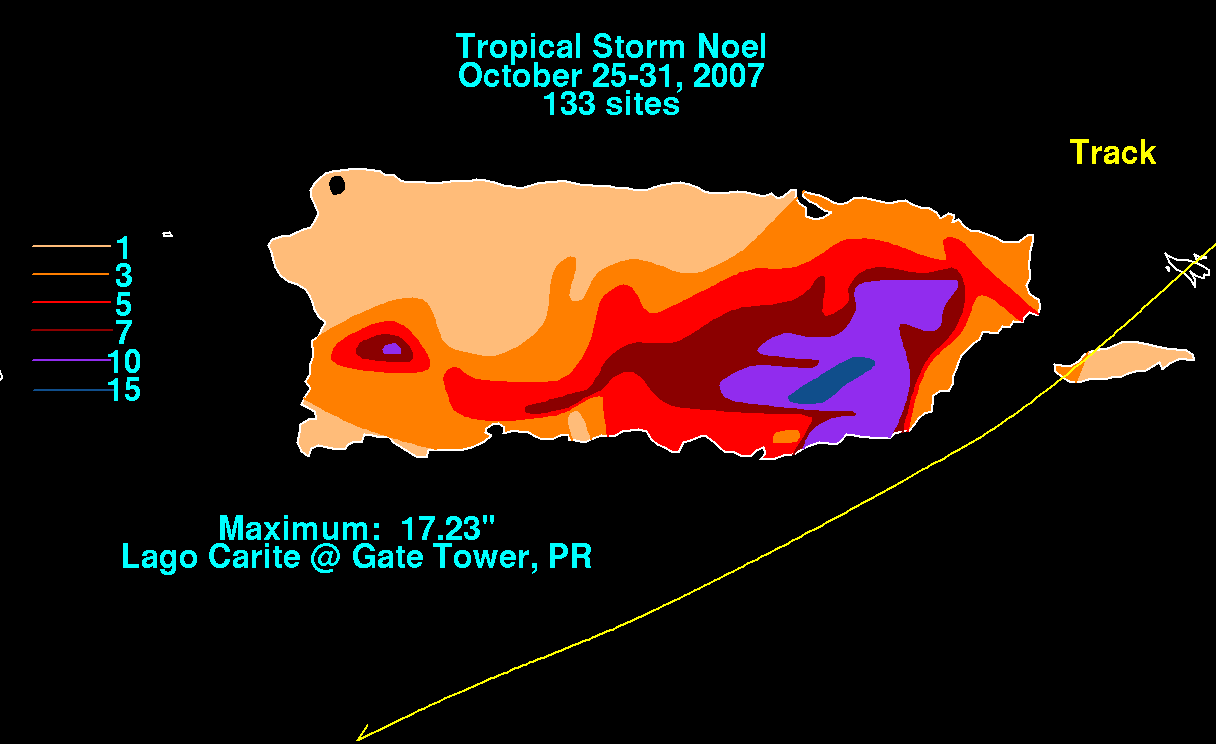
Rainfall summary for precursor system of Noel in Puerto Rico

Heavy rainfall fell across the northern Lesser Antilles for several days in association with the precursor disturbance, unofficially reaching over 6 inches (150 mm) on Saint Croix and Saint Thomas.

The precursor disturbance also dropped heavy rainfall across Puerto Rico for several days, leaving grounds saturated and causing surface runoff. Precipitation peaked at 17.23 inches (438 mm) at Carite Lake. Flash flooding was reported in Carolina, and a mudslide occurred in Utuado. Flooding occurred along several rivers, including the Río de la Plata, with a reading of 8.9 feet (2.7 m) above flood stage at Toa Baja reported late on October 27. In response to high water levels, officials opened dam gates along the Río de la Plata and the Río Carraízo. There were no official reports of fatalities.

=== Dominican Republic ===
In the Dominican Republic, the highest rainfall amount reported was 21.65 inches (550 mm) at Padre Las Casas. People in the path of the flooding escaped to roof and tree tops; more than 50,000 people left their homes. Additionally, about 1,000 prisoners were evacuated due to flooding. For about two hours, the entire island was without power. Two days later, one-third of the population was still without electricity. The heavy rainfall caused extreme flooding throughout the island, which caused mudslides, as well. It is reported that buildings were swept down the sides of mountains. The flooding damaged over 24,500 homes, of which 6,000 were completely destroyed. Many rivers topped their banks, causing flash flooding in valleys, which killed 10 people in the town of Piedra Blanca. Many roads and bridges were destroyed, isolating some villages from outside civilization; at least 21 bridges in the country were washed away or collapsed. By just days after the storm, 1,522 people were rescued from flood waters.

Severe crop losses were reported. The primary agricultural damages were to plantain, banana, tomato and red onion crops. In some locations, production of such fruits was completely lost. Crop damage in the country totaled $77.7 million (2007 USD). Livestock losses were also reported. There was severe damage to 40% of water distribution, and 60% of 122 aqueducts. Due to health concerns and the onslaught of disease, some medical centers reached maximum capacity. In all, the storm caused at least 87 fatalities in the country, and 42 others were reported missing. Over 65,000 people were left homeless, and over 46 bridges were in some way affected by the floods. However, because many villages were isolated, these totals may not reflect the actual damage.

=== Haiti ===
Wettest tropical cyclones and their remnants in Haiti Highest-known totals
| Precipitation | | | Storm | Location | Ref. |
| Rank | mm | in | Storm | Location | Ref. |
|---|---|---|---|---|---|
| 1 | 1,447.8 | 57.00 | Flora 1963 | Miragoâne | |
| 2 | 934.0 | 36.77 | Melissa 2025 | Camp Perrin | |
| 3 | 654.8 | 25.78 | Noel 2007 | Camp Perrin | |
| 4 | 604.5 | 23.80 | Matthew 2016 | Anse-á-Veau | |
| 5 | 410.0 | 16.14 | Lili 2002 | Camp Perrin | |
| 6 | 323.0 | 12.72 | Hanna 2008 | Camp Perrin | |
| 7 | 273.0 | 10.75 | Gustav 2008 | Camp Perrin | |
| 8 | 168.0 | 6.614 | Laura 2020 | Port-Au-Prince | |
| 9 | 65.0 | 2.56 | Fox 1952 | Ouanaminthe | |

Noel is the third wettest tropical cyclone in Haiti on record, dropping 654.8 mm (25.78 in) at Camp Perrin. Rainfall across the rest of the country was generally in the 25 to 225 mm (0.98 to 8.86 in) range. Five days of rainfall caused severe flooding and mudslides, affecting about 3,252 families. Rivers and creeks swelled up, forcing communities to evacuate. In the vulnerable country to flooding, about 500 houses were damaged by the floods' onslaught, of which 400 were completely destroyed. The cities that were the worst affected by the flooding were Cayes, Cantaloupe, Camp Perrin, Chantal, Maniche, Holy louis of the South and Torbeck. The main road to the country's capital, Port-au-Prince, was blocked, in addition to other roads throughout the country. The Haitian Civil Protection Office initially attributed 18 deaths to Noel in the country; two additional deaths were reported, one due to flooding and another due to being crushed by a tree. In total, 73 deaths were reported in the country, while 17 others remained missing as of December 17. In addition, 7,500 in Haiti were displaced by the storm, and 104 were injured.

=== Jamaica, Cuba, and the Bahamas ===
Tropical Storm Noel over the Bahamas on November 1

Heavy rainfall fell across portions of Jamaica; the rains triggered a mudslide that caused a house to collapse, killing one person. The eastern end of the island was hit particularly hard. Several communities were isolated, and roads and bridges were impassable in some areas. The rainfall caused at least 20 mudslides across the island; one of them caused a large pile-up that persisted for hours.

In Cuba, the storm dropped about 6 inches (150 mm) of rainfall in six hours in the city of Baracoa, which overflowed reservoirs in the region. The highest 24 hour total noted was at Mangos de Baraguá, where 364 mm (14.3 in) fell between the mornings of October 29 and October 30. Strong winds and rough waves were reported along the northern coastline. The storm caused severe flooding and mudslides, which damaged over 21,000 homes in the province of Granma alone, and destroyed about 120 homes in Camagüey. Flooding isolated a few areas, and destroyed more than 3.9 million lb (1.8 million kg) of crops in Ciego de Ávila Province. The rainfall contributed to precipitation totals being 300% of the normal rainfall in Guantánamo Province, which caused a dam in the province to overflow. In the province of Santiago, about 400 km (250 mi) of roads were damaged. At least 98,000 people throughout the country evacuated from the flooding; of which nearly 20,000 did so to escape the Cauto River which topped its banks, and 40,000 were in the province of Granma. Many stayed in shelters. Of Cuba's 239 rivers, at least 137 overflowed. One fatality was reported in Cuba; total damage is estimated at $500 million (2007 USD).

Tropical Storm Noel dropped heavy rainfall across portions of the Bahamas, reaching a record total of 15 inches (380 mm) at one station. Sustained winds were around 40 mph (64 km/h) throughout the central and northwestern regions of the island chain. Extensive flooding was reported, especially on Abaco Island, forcing the evacuation of over 700 people. Long Island was hit the worst, where flood waters reportedly reached 5 ft (1.5 m) deep. Residents of the island deemed the damage "devastating", reporting that flood waters were the highest in 60 years. In some locations, houses were under several feet of water, while roads throughout the Bahamas suffered damage. The Deadman's Cay Airport was also flooded, and on the island of Exuma, six of the nine schools received extensive damage. About 16,000 people were affected by the floods, including 10,000 on Long Island. The Nassau International Airport was closed due to the storm, and most cruise ships failed to arrive on schedule. One fatality occurred when a man on the island of Exuma abandoned a stalled truck, and was subsequently swept away by flood waters into a nearby pond. When Prime Minister Hubert Ingraham visited hard-hit areas to assess the damage, he stated that it would be possible for Public Works to "be able to get some pumps in to pump some of the water out." However, he also noted that, "In some areas that will be very difficult because you have ponds on both sides of the road."

=== United States ===
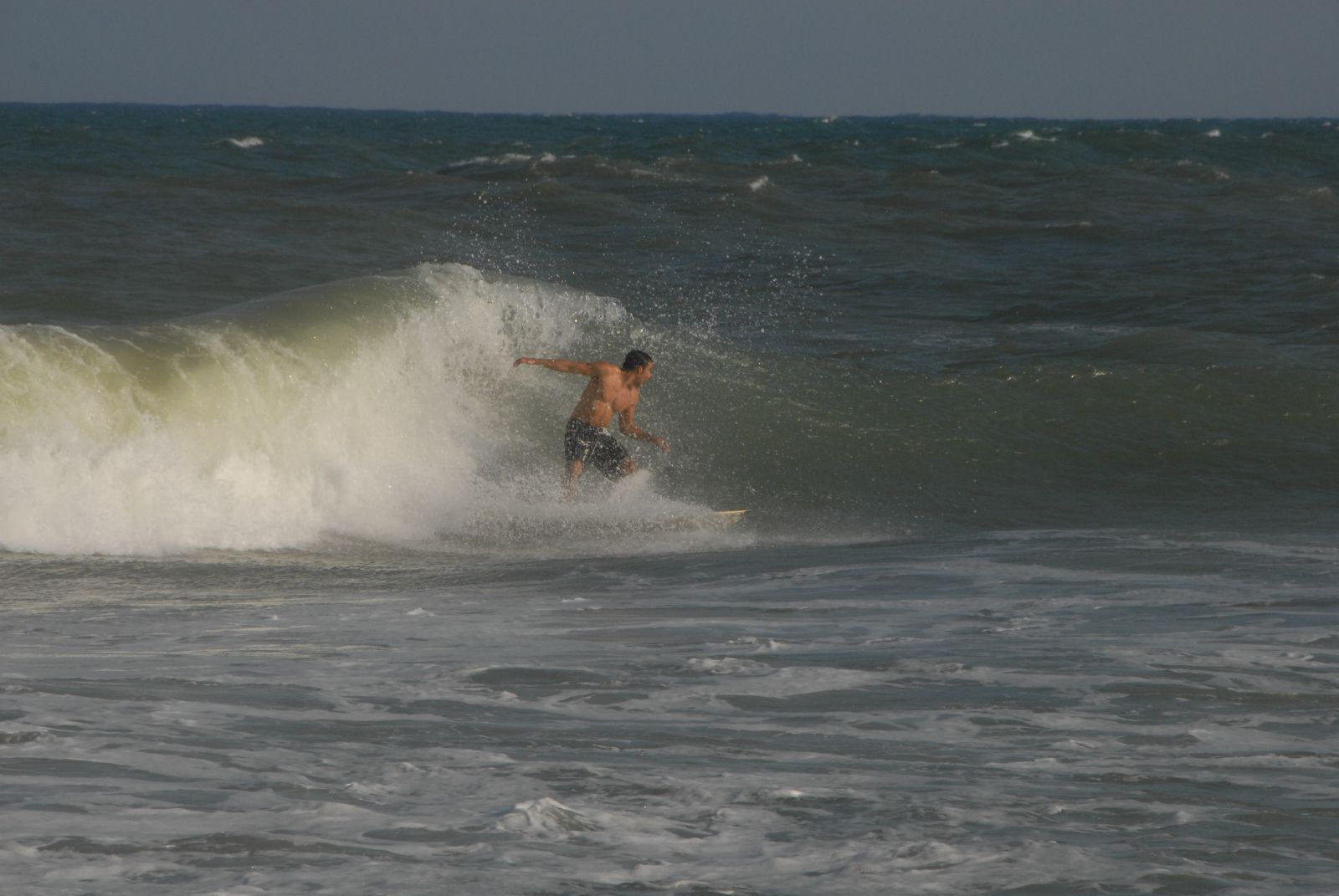
A surfer in waves from Hurricane Noel along the Florida coast

Hurricane Noel made its closest approach to Florida on November 2. The interaction of Noel and a ridge to its north produced strong, gusty winds and high waves along the east coast of the state. Throughout Palm Beach, Broward and Miami-Dade counties, 5,000 customers lost power. Beach erosion was significant, amounting to about $4 million (2007 USD) in damage. Near West Palm Beach, a 20 ft (6.1 m) sand dune was eroded to its foundation. In other areas, large portions of beach were washed away, prompting concerns about properties and structures along the shore. Rainfall was light, with local rainfall amounts up to 2.14 inches (54 mm) as Noel's rain bands moved in from the Atlantic.

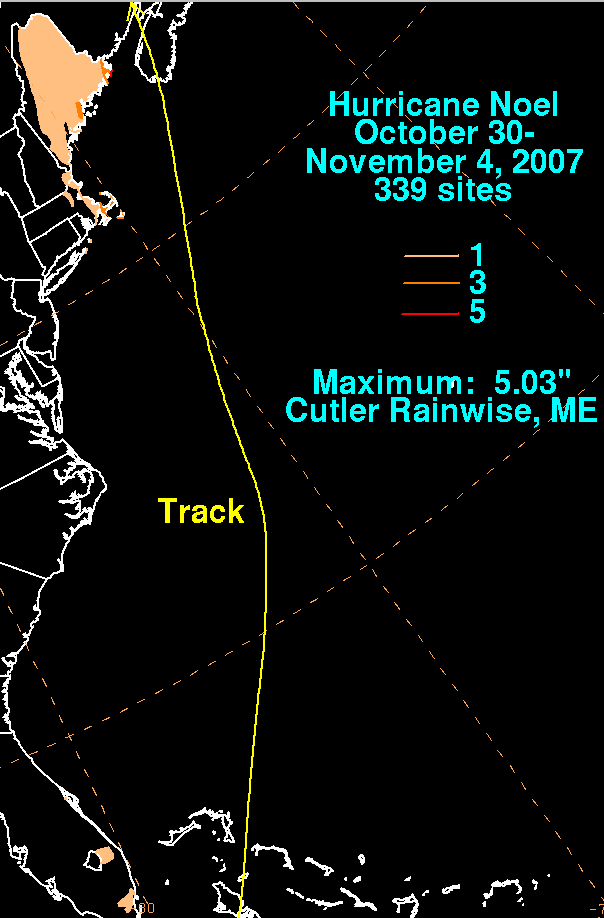
Rainfall summary for Noel over Florida and New England

As an extratropical cyclone, Noel interacted with high pressure building in from the northwest, forming a tight pressure gradient that produced moderate winds along the Outer Banks of North Carolina, primarily on November 2. At Cedar Island, sustained winds of 43 mph (69 km/h) were reported. Along the coast from Cape Lookout northward, gusts peaked at around 60 mph (97 km/h). The storm produced strong waves, flooding NC 12 with up to 5 ft (1.5 m) of water and sand on November 3. About 6,000 people lost power after winds knocked down a power line. Eight oceanfront properties were damaged, and damage in North Carolina totaled $72,000 (2007 USD). As Noel was tracking northward parallel to the U.S. East Coast, high winds affected several states. Beach erosion was reported in New Jersey, in some cases eroding a 10 ft (3.0 m) vertical drop. On Long Island, strong winds knocked down trees and power lines.

On November 3, the western side of the storm hit eastern New England, particularly coastal Massachusetts, Rhode Island and Maine, with hurricane-force wind gusts. Massachusetts reported the highest wind gust of 89 mph (143 km/h), with sustained winds topping out at 59 mph (95 km/h). Throughout Cape Cod, trees and tree limbs were downed. Rainfall peaked at 5.03 in (128 mm) at Cutler Rainwise, Maine, while other reports ranged from 2 to 4 inches (51 to 102 mm) across the region. In northern Maine, temperatures were cold enough to support 6 in (150 mm) of snowfall. Strong surf caused flooding along the coast, with Nantucket and Martha's Vineyard suffering the most; several beachfront houses were severely damaged. A few roads were closed, mainly due to flooding and downed trees and tree limbs. Old North Wharf in Nantucket was damaged beyond repair, while numerous small boats were washed ashore. Power outages were widespread; about 80,000 customers in Massachusetts, mostly on Cape Cod, and 9,000 in Maine lost electric power. Despite the effects, no fatalities or significant property damage were reported.

=== Atlantic Canada and Quebec ===
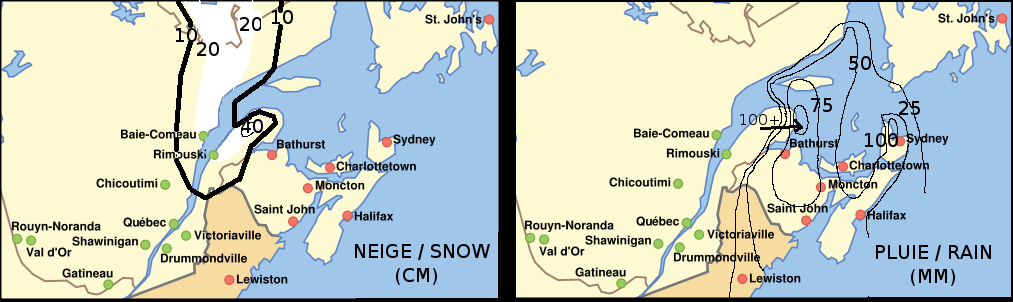
Rain and snow falls in Canada

The storm continued on into Atlantic Canada with full force in the latter part of November 3 and early on November 4. Many flights were cancelled out of several airports, and around 150,000 people in New Brunswick and Nova Scotia lost power for several days, due to high winds and "salt fog" disabling the power grid. Flooding was also reported due to the heavy rainfall. In Prince Edward Island, 10,000 people lost electricity. Newfoundland was relatively unaffected, although ferries between it and Nova Scotia were canceled for the entire weekend and winds peaked at 180 km/h (110 mph) in Wreckhouse. Over 70 mm (2.8 in) of rainfall was received in some areas, and waves of over 12 metres (39 feet) were reported in the Atlantic, off the coast of Nova Scotia. Several coastal roads were washed out, with boulders thrown far on shore by the pounding surf. One fish farm in Nova Scotia took $1,000,000 in damage alone, losing almost all of its catch.

In eastern Quebec, up to 130 mm (5.1 in) of rain fell in Gaspésie, Anticosti, and Eastern Côte-Nord, causing flooding in several areas. In the Bas-Saint-Laurent, Sept-Îles and Baie-Comeau regions, it was 20 cm (8 in) of snow that fell, causing a bus accident with 10 injuries near Saint-Simon. Severe rains flooded the water treatment facility in Percé, Quebec, leaving the city under a boil-water advisory; the city was also cut from the rest of the province as the heavy rains made a short section of Quebec Route 132 unusable. In Quebec, just under 19,000 Hydro-Québec customers lost power, and activity was affected at several Côte-Nord plants, including plants in the aluminum sector. A major transmission line in the Minganie region was damaged by the heavy wet snow and locally freezing rain, causing blackouts and school closures. One fatality related to the storm was reported in Canada when a boat capsized.

=== Western Europe ===
Cyclone Tilo on 8 November

After crossing Atlantic Canada, Noel's remnants turned east and accelerated across the Atlantic Ocean before being absorbed by Cyclone Tilo over the Norwegian Sea several days later. Subsequently, on 8–9 November, the storm surge from the combined system led to the North Sea flood of 2007, leading to flooding in coastal Belgium, Denmark, Germany, the Netherlands, Norway and the United Kingdom.

== Aftermath ==
The government of the Dominican Republic distributed emergency supplies to 145,000 families following the storm, including food, blankets, mattresses, and mosquito nets. The relief aid amounted to about US$3 million. The government requested a US$200 million loan from the Inter-American Development Bank and the World Bank on November 1. Storm flooding led to an outbreak of leptospirosis in the Dominican Republic in the weeks following the passage of Noel, causing 25 deaths and infecting 193 others. The government of Haiti allocated about US$1.5 million for those affected by the storm.

Due to the extensive damage and number of deaths caused by the storm, the name Noel was retired by the World Meteorological Organization in May 2008, and it will not be used again for an Atlantic tropical cyclone. The name was replaced with Nestor for the 2013 season.

== See also ==
- Hurricanes in Hispaniola
- List of the wettest tropical cyclones by country
- Timeline of the 2007 Atlantic hurricane season
- List of Cuba hurricanes
- List of Florida hurricanes (2000–present)
- Hurricane Tomas (2010)
- Hurricane Irene (2011)
