= Frank País Airport =

Airport serving Holguín, Cuba

Frank País Airport Aeropuerto Frank País
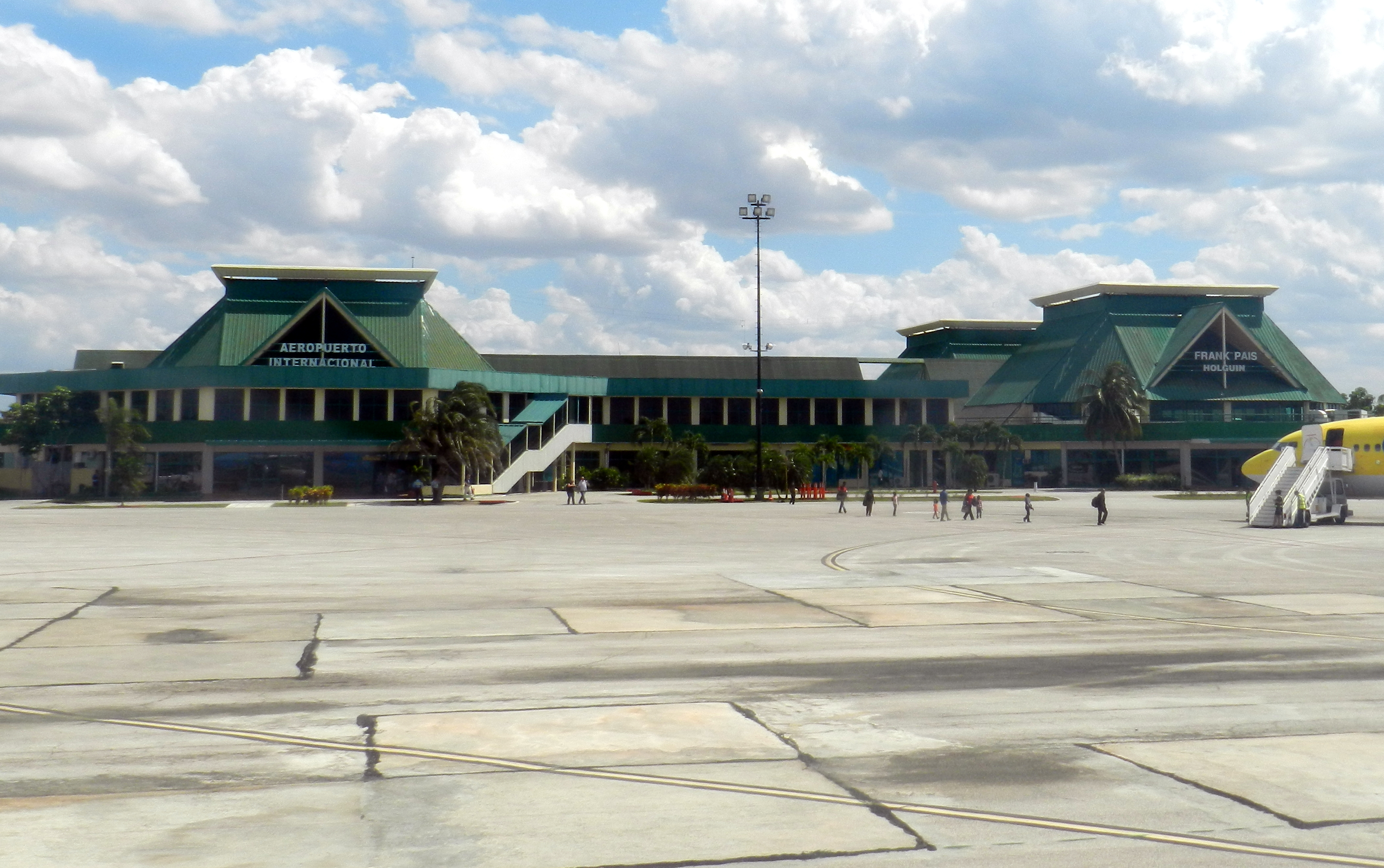
- IATA: HOG; ICAO: MUHG

Summary
- Airport type: Military/Public
- Operator: ECASA
- Serves: Holguín
- Location: Holguín, Holguín Province, Cuba
- Elevation AMSL: 110 m (360 ft)
- Coordinates: 20°46′44″N 076°18′44″W

Map
- Location in Cuba

Runways
Direction	Length		Surface
Direction	m	ft	Surface
05/23	3,238	10,623	Asphalt

Frank País Airport (Spanish: Aeropuerto Frank País) (IATA: HOG, ICAO: MUHG) is an airport serving Holguín, a city in the Cuban province of Holguín. It bears the name of Cuban revolutionary Frank País. The airport was built in 1962 initially only for military purposes before civilian air operations began in 1966. It consists of a domestic and an international terminal, which was built in 1996 and expanded in 2007.

== History ==
The aviation history of Holguín originates in a makeshift runway built near the Hill of the Cross (Spanish: Loma de la Cruz) in the city. Domingo Rosillo landed on this airstrip in 1914, one year after becoming the first pilot to fly between Key West and Havana. The first official airport serving Holguín was inaugurated on 30 October 1930. On this day, the airport served as one of several stops on the first airmail route in Cuba, between Havana and Santiago de Cuba. The airport was located in the neighbourhood of Peralta and named after mambí General Julio Grave de Peralta. However, because there was often dense fog at the airport, it closed a few years afterward; and operations moved to another site close to the location of the current airport.

In 1962, a military airbase was established on the outskirts of the city. Civilian air operations shifted to an area within the base on 10 November 1966, thus establishing Frank País Airport. As the tourism sector in Guardalavaca grew during the early 1990s, there was a need for a new international terminal, which was constructed in 1996 by Canadian infrastructure company Intelcan Technosystems. In 2007, the capacity of the terminal was doubled to 1,200 passengers per hour through a 1,300-square-metre (14,000 sq ft) expansion, which took one year to complete. Carried out to reduce congestion in the terminal during peak season, the expansion included additional customs facilities and a new VIP lounge. The inauguration of the expanded facilities was presided over by politician and then future First Secretary of the Communist Party of Cuba, Miguel Díaz-Canel.

On 25 March 2020, it was announced that international flights from the airport were ceasing because of the coronavirus shutdown. Flights began again on 3 November 2020, with three flights.

== Infrastructure ==
=== Terminals ===
Frank País Airport has two terminals, one serving domestic flights and the other international flights. The international terminal can handle up to 1,200 passengers per hour and has various duty-free shops, restaurants and car rental agencies as well as a VIP lounge.

=== Airfield ===
Frank País Airport has a single runway, 05/23, which has dimensions 3,238 by 45 metres (10,623 ft × 148 ft) and is equipped with an instrument landing system. The apron in front of the passenger terminal has six parking stands.

=== Military usage ===
Built during the Cold War, the airbase is one of the most important in the country, housing large barracks and bunkers for fighter aircraft. The base is located on the north side of the airport and has its own apron.

== Airlines and destinations ==
The following airlines operate regular scheduled and charter flights at Frank País Airport:

Airlines	Destinations
American Airlines	Miami
Cubana de Aviación	Havana
Neos	Rome–Fiumicino (Note: Neos' flight from Rome to Holguín makes a stop in La Romana. However, the airline does not have eighth freedom traffic rights to transport passengers solely between La Romana and Holguín.)

== Access ==
The Central Highway (Spanish: Carretera Central) connects Frank País Airport to the city of Holguín, which lies about 12 kilometres (7.5 mi) to the northeast. The beaches of the Costa Holguinera resort of Guardalavaca, Playa Esmeralda, Playa Pesquero, and Playa Blanca are situated at 1 hour travel and is a reason Canadian and European charters land here.
