= North Sea flood =

North Sea flood may refer to:

- North Sea flood of 1953
- North Sea flood of 1962
- North Sea flood of 2007

== See also ==
- Storm tides of the North Sea
- Floods in the Netherlands
