= Yamanigüey =

- Village
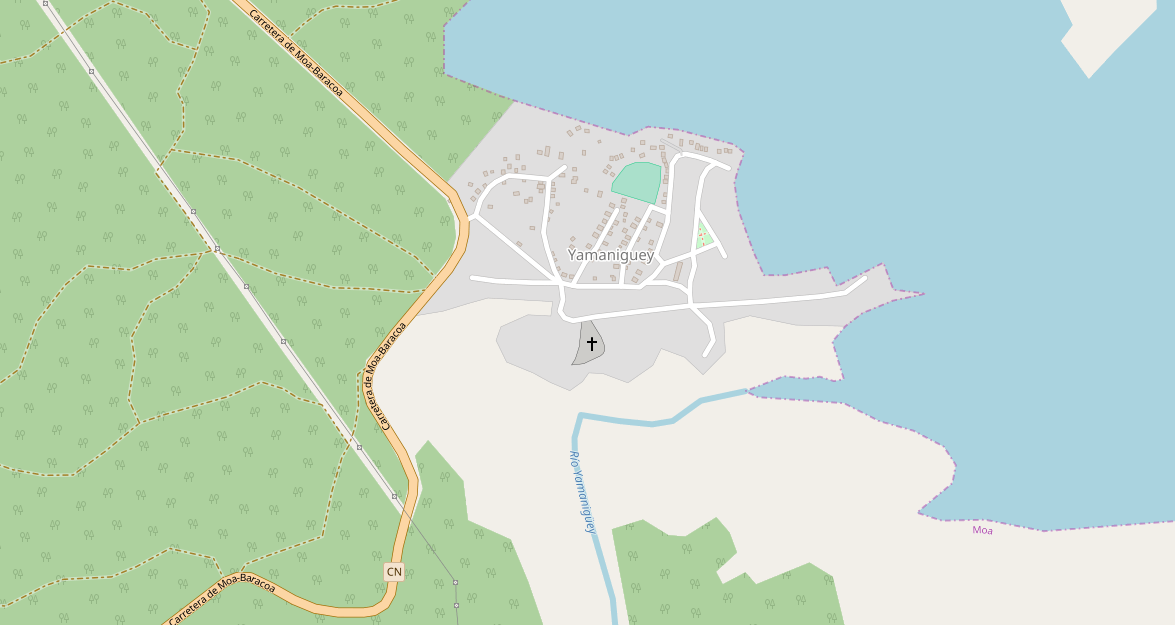
- OSM map showing Yamanigüey

- Location of Yamanigüey in Cuba
- Coordinates: 20°34′44.0″N 74°44′20.5″W
- Country: Cuba
- Province: Holguín
- Municipality: Moa
- Elevation: 15 m (49 ft)

Population (2009)
  - Total: 2,394
- Time zone: UTC-5 (EST)
- Area code: +53-24

Yamanigüey is a Cuban village and consejo popular ("people's council", i.e. hamlet) of the municipality of Moa, in Holguín Province. In 2009 it had a population of 2,394.

== Geography ==
Located on the Atlantic Coast, in the north-eastern corner of the Alejandro de Humboldt National Park, Yamanigüey spans on a little peninsula in front of a bay, north of the source of the homonym river, and is crossed by the "Circuito Norte" highway (CN).

The village lies between the towns of Moa (26 km northeast) and Baracoa (47 km southwest), and the nearest settlements to it are Brinquín, Cañete and Cayo Grande (all three about 3 km east) Punta Gorda (15 km northeast) and Nibujón (17 km southwest). Its territory is partially surrounded by the Nipe-Sagua-Baracoa, a mountain range that occupies the provincial territories of Holguín and Guantánamo.

== Nature ==
The natural environment surrounding Yamanigüey is one of the habitats of two species of plants: the Phyllanthus phialanthoides, belonging to the genus Phyllanthus and discovered in 2017; and the Euphorbia munizii, belonging to the genus Euphorbia.

== See also ==
- Municipalities of Cuba
- List of cities in Cuba
