= Rafael Freyre =

- Municipality
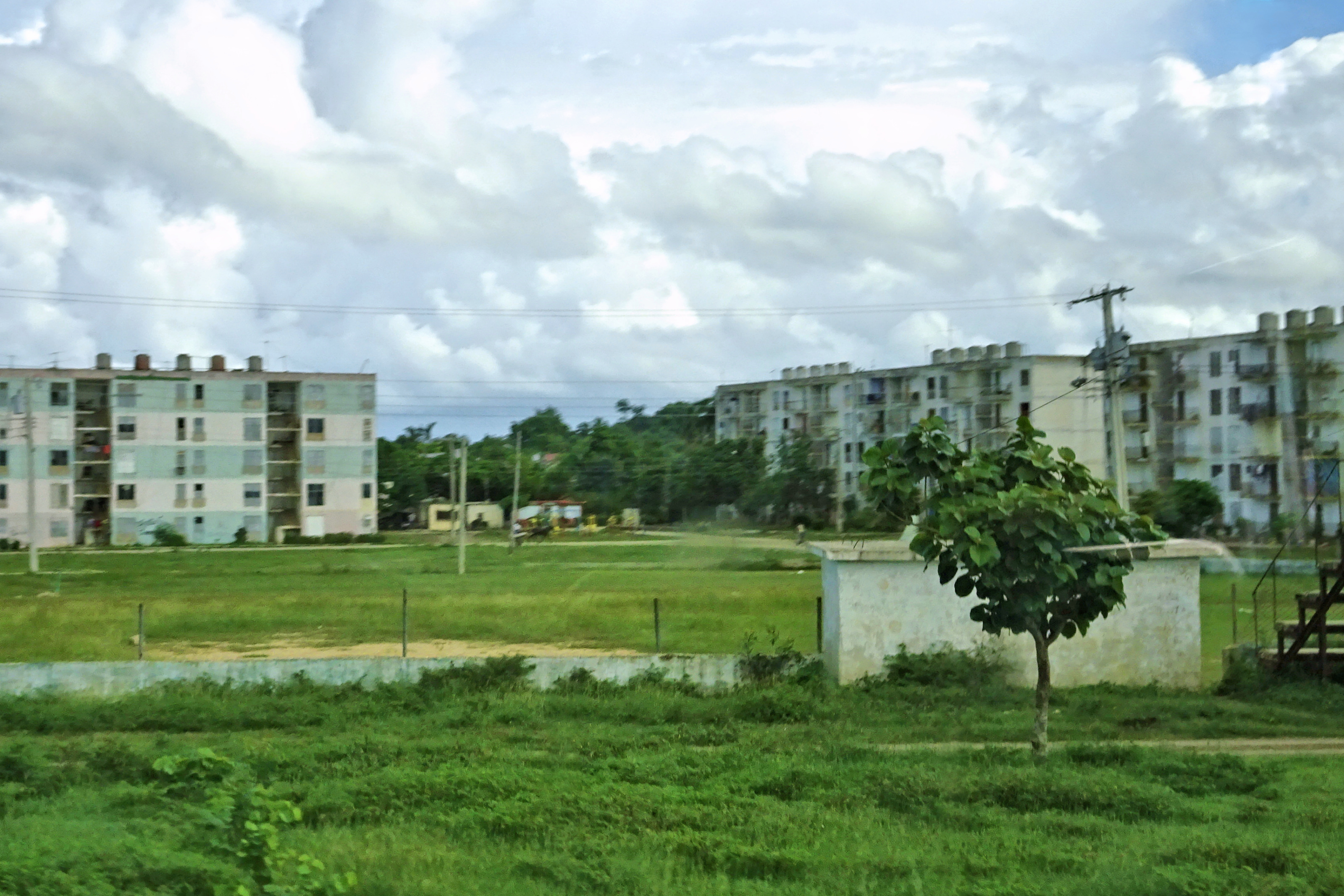

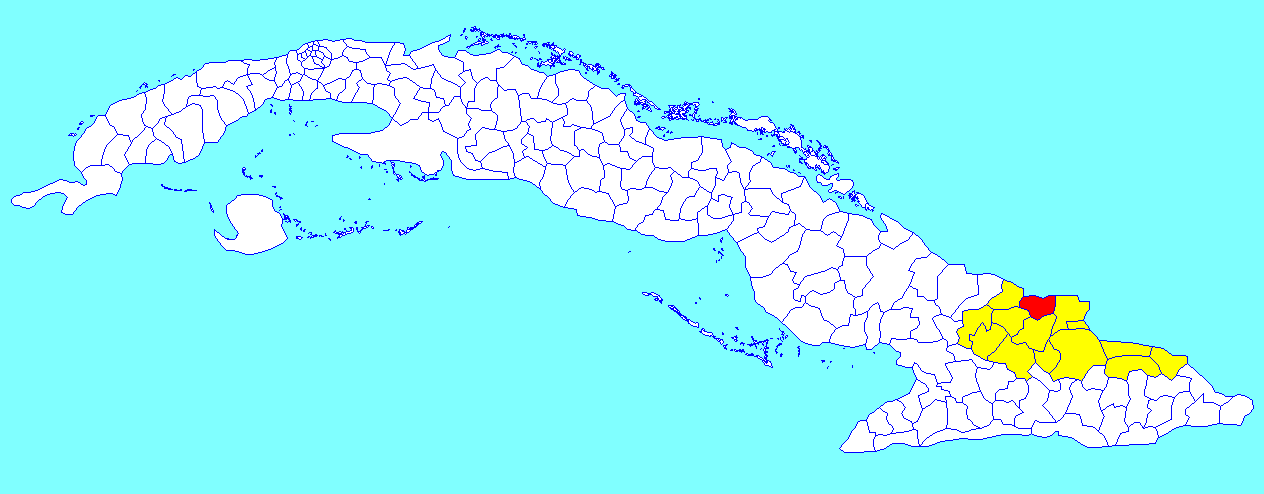
- Rafael Freyre municipality (red) within Holguín Province (yellow) and Cuba
- Coordinates: 21°01′41″N 75°59′47″W
- Country: Cuba
- Province: Holguín

Area
  - Total: 620 km^{2} (240 sq mi)
- Elevation: 25 m (82 ft)

Population (2022)
  - Total: 53,408
  - Density: 86/km^{2} (220/sq mi)
- Time zone: UTC-5 (EST)
- Area code: +53-24

Rafael Freyre is a municipality and town in the Holguín Province of Cuba.

== Overview ==
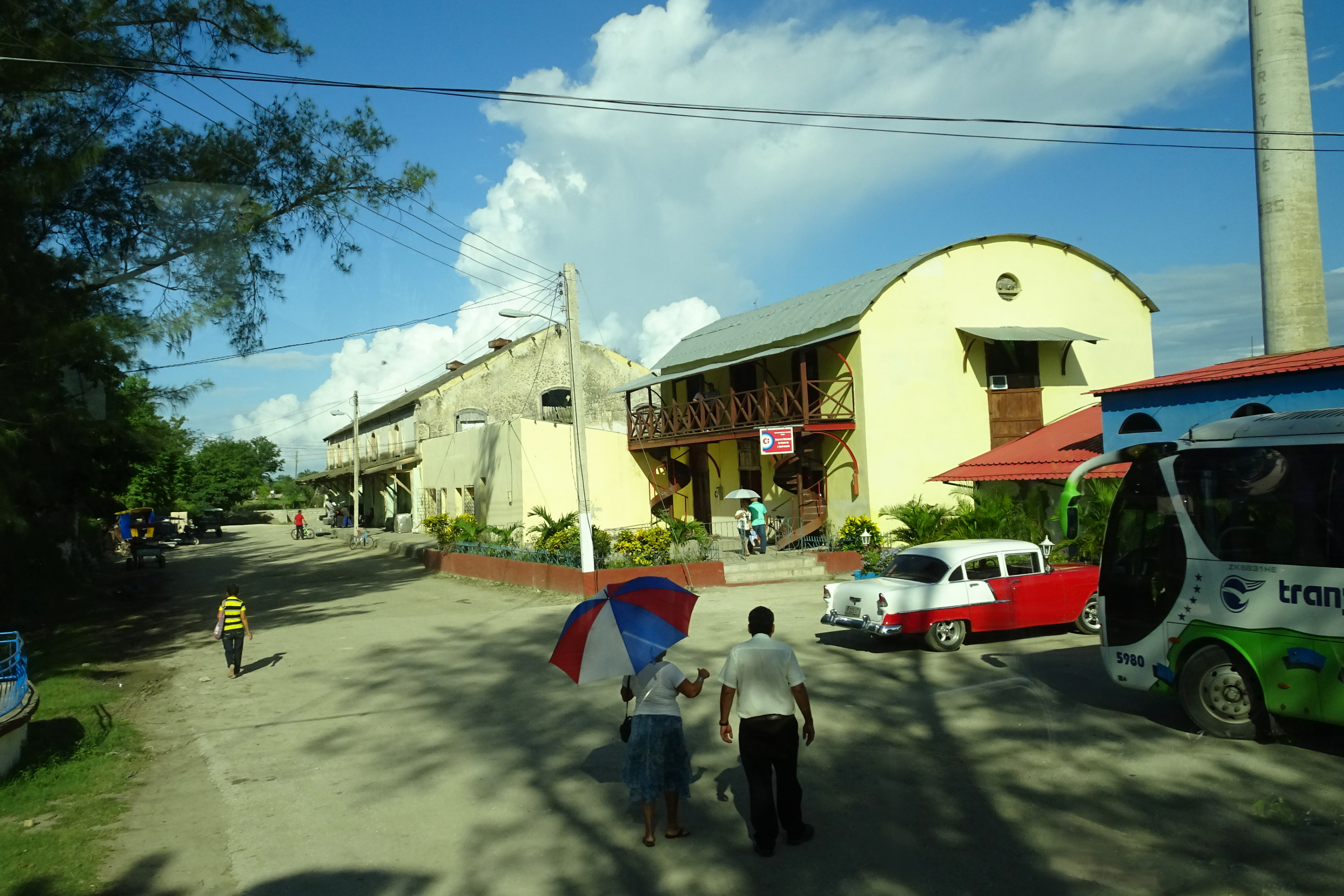
Rafael Freyre train station

The main municipal settlement (Rafael Freyre itself) developed around the sugar cane factory "Central Santa Lucía". The only middle school in the area, “ESBU Rafael Freyre Torres,” is attended by a few hundred students from small towns near Los Mineros, La Viuda, Cochico, and other nearby towns.

Some of its most popular destinations are the north coast beaches, such as Playa Guardalavaca and Guardalavaca, which are both natural white sand beaches in the bordering municipality of Banes.

In a small village called Bariay, there is a monument that marks the arrival of Christopher Columbus.

== Demographics ==
In 2022, the municipality of Rafael Freyre had a population of 53,408. With a total area of 620 km^{2} (240 sq mi), it has a population density of 86/km^{2} (220/sq mi).

== See also ==
- List of cities in Cuba
- Municipalities of Cuba
