= Moa, Cuba =

Moa
- Municipality
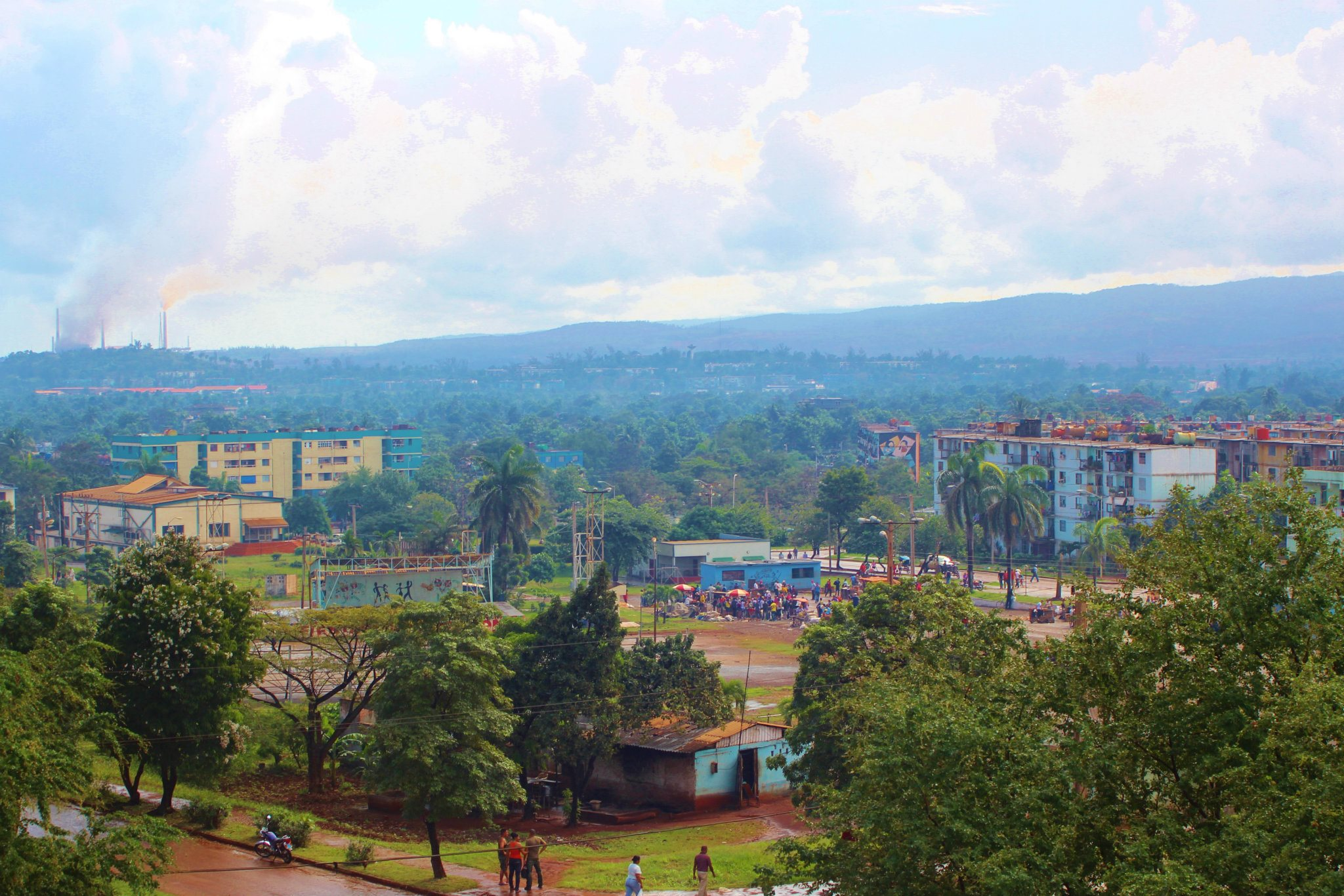
- A photo of Moa with the many nickel factories in the background

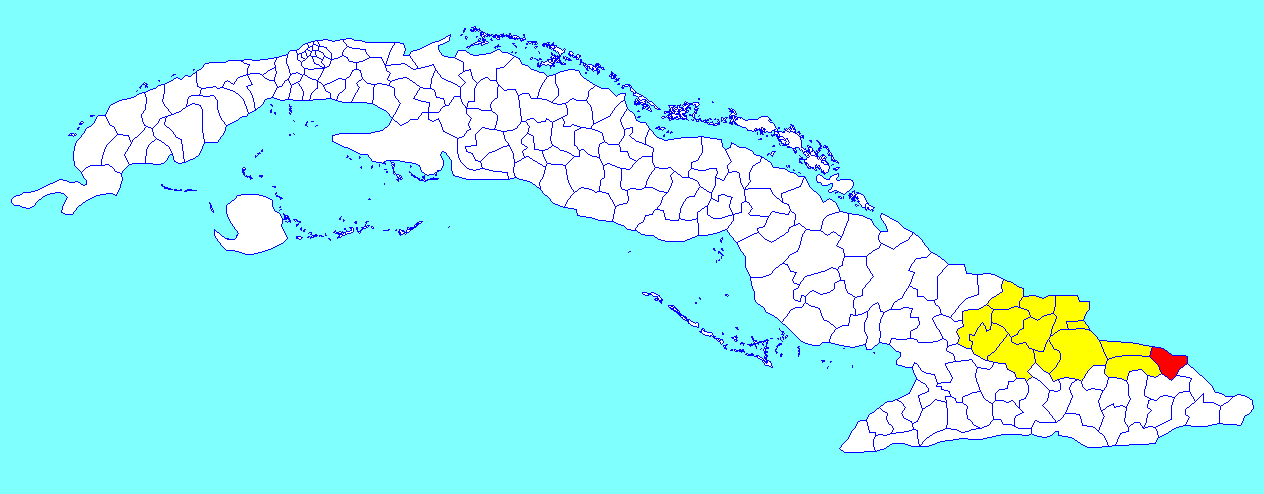
- Moa municipality (red) within Holguín Province (yellow) and Cuba
- Coordinates: 20°38′23″N 74°55′3″W
- Country: Cuba
- Province: Holguín

Government
  - President: Alexei Martínez Mora

Area
  - Total: 730 km^{2} (280 sq mi)
- Elevation: 5 m (16 ft)

Population (2022)
  - Total: 71,660
  - Density: 98/km^{2} (250/sq mi)
- Time zone: UTC-5 (EST)
- Area code: +53-24

Moa is a municipality and an industrial city in the Holguín Province of Cuba. Its name is believed to mean "water here".

== History ==
Moa, one of the youngest cities in Cuba, was founded in 1939.

== Geography ==
Located in the easternmost area of its province, at the borders with Guantánamo Province, Moa is bordered by the municipalities of Sagua de Tánamo, Frank País, Baracoa and Yateras.

The large municipal territory includes the Nipe-Sagua-Baracoa mountain range and the Alejandro de Humboldt National Park. The villages belonging to Moa municipality are Arroyo Blanco, Brinquín, Cañete, Cayo Grande, Centeno, Cocalito, Cupey, Farallones, Punta Gorda, Yaguaneque and Yamanigüey. The city includes the quarters (repartos) of Centro, Atlántico, Caribe, José Martí, La Playa, Las Coloradas, Los Checos, Los Mangos, Miraflores and Rolo Monterrey.

== Demographics ==
In 2022, the municipality of Moa had a population of 71,660. With a total area of 730 km^{2} (280 sq mi), it has a population density of 98/km^{2} (250/sq mi). This city has the youngest citizens in all of Cuba, and is the second largest city (and the fourth municipality) by population in the Holguín Province.

== Environment ==
Large nickel and cobalt bearing laterite located in the Moa area are exploited in part by a joint venture with the Canadian company Sherritt International.

The extensive mining and nickel processing has large impact on the local environment. The coastal waters and nearby land is contaminated by the pollution from mines and processing plants. The soil has a reddish tint due to the laterite soil, which has a high iron content.

== Economy ==
=== Nickel production ===
The nickel production is concentrated on the factories "Pedro Soto Alba" and "Ernesto Che Guevara". While the Nickel Processor Plant "Pedro Soto Alba" is a limited liability company between Cuba and Sherritt International Canadian Company, the "Ernesto Che Guevara" belongs to the government enterprise Cubaníquel. As average per year, The "Soto Alba" and "Che Guevara" produce more than 30,000 tons of nickel each. This industry is what makes Moa a leading nickel producer, and what brings the town most of its GDP.

== Transport ==
The city is served by the Orestes Acosta Airport (IATA: MOA, ICAO: MUMO), a regional airport with daily flights to Havana. It is crossed in the middle by the state highway "Circuito Norte" (CN), the second longest one after the "Carretera Central".

== Gallery ==
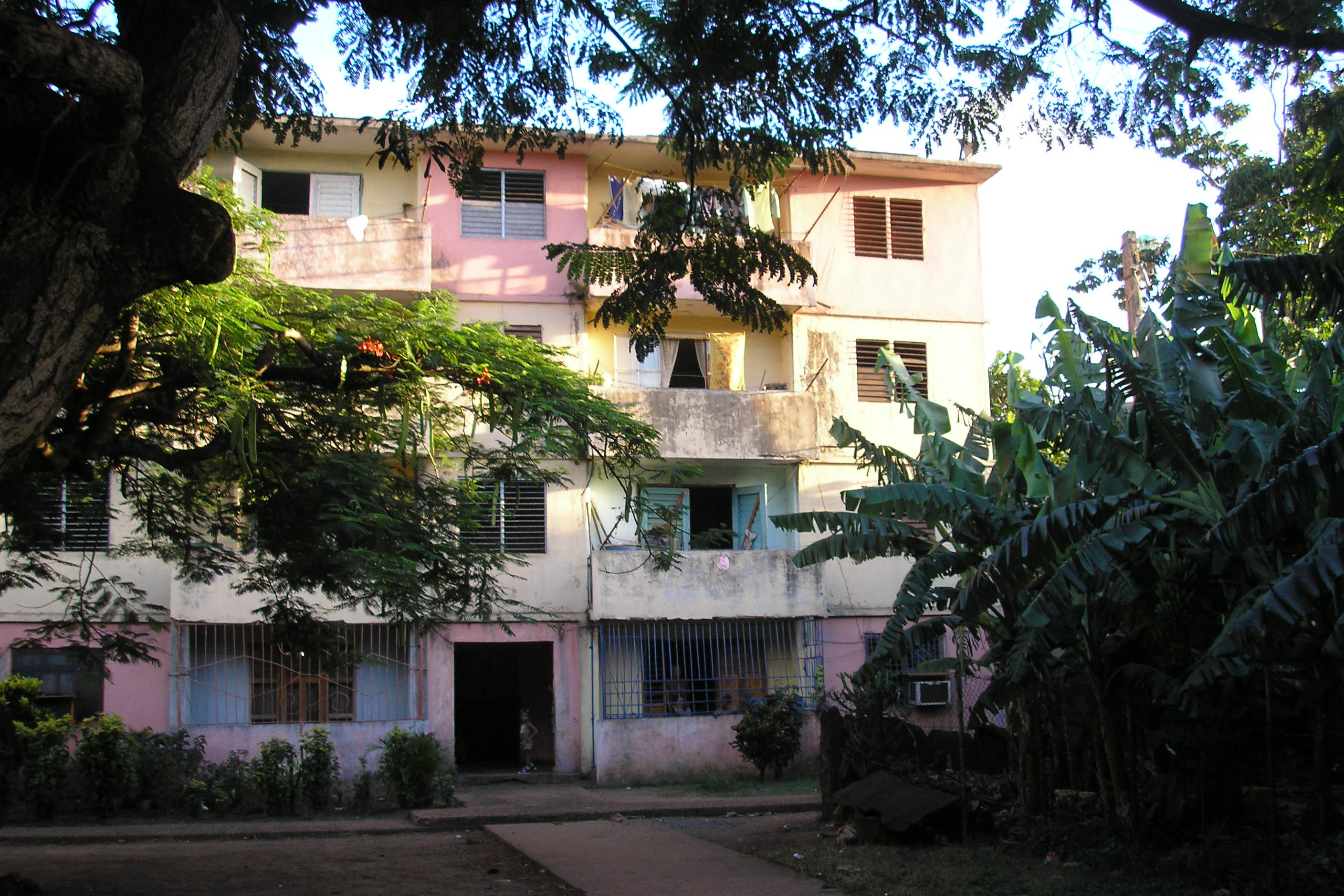
A CDR building

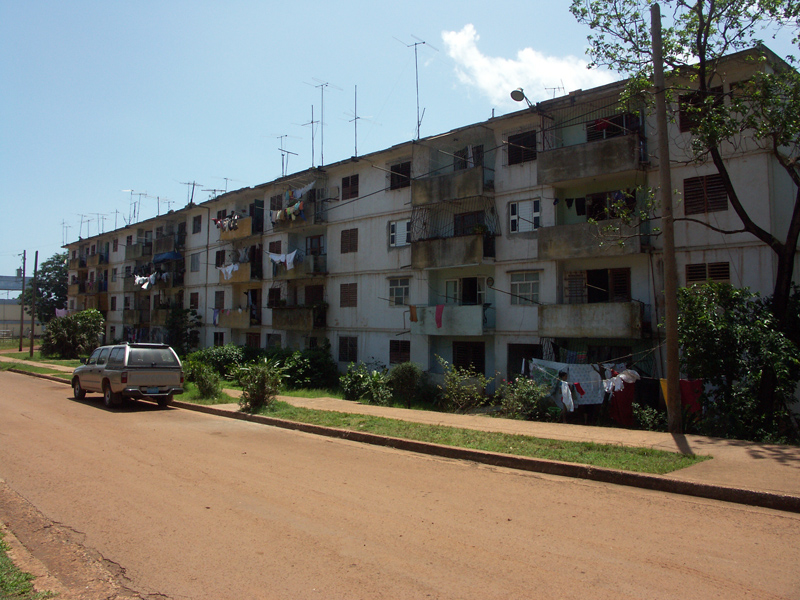
Apartment buildings in Las Coloradas quarter

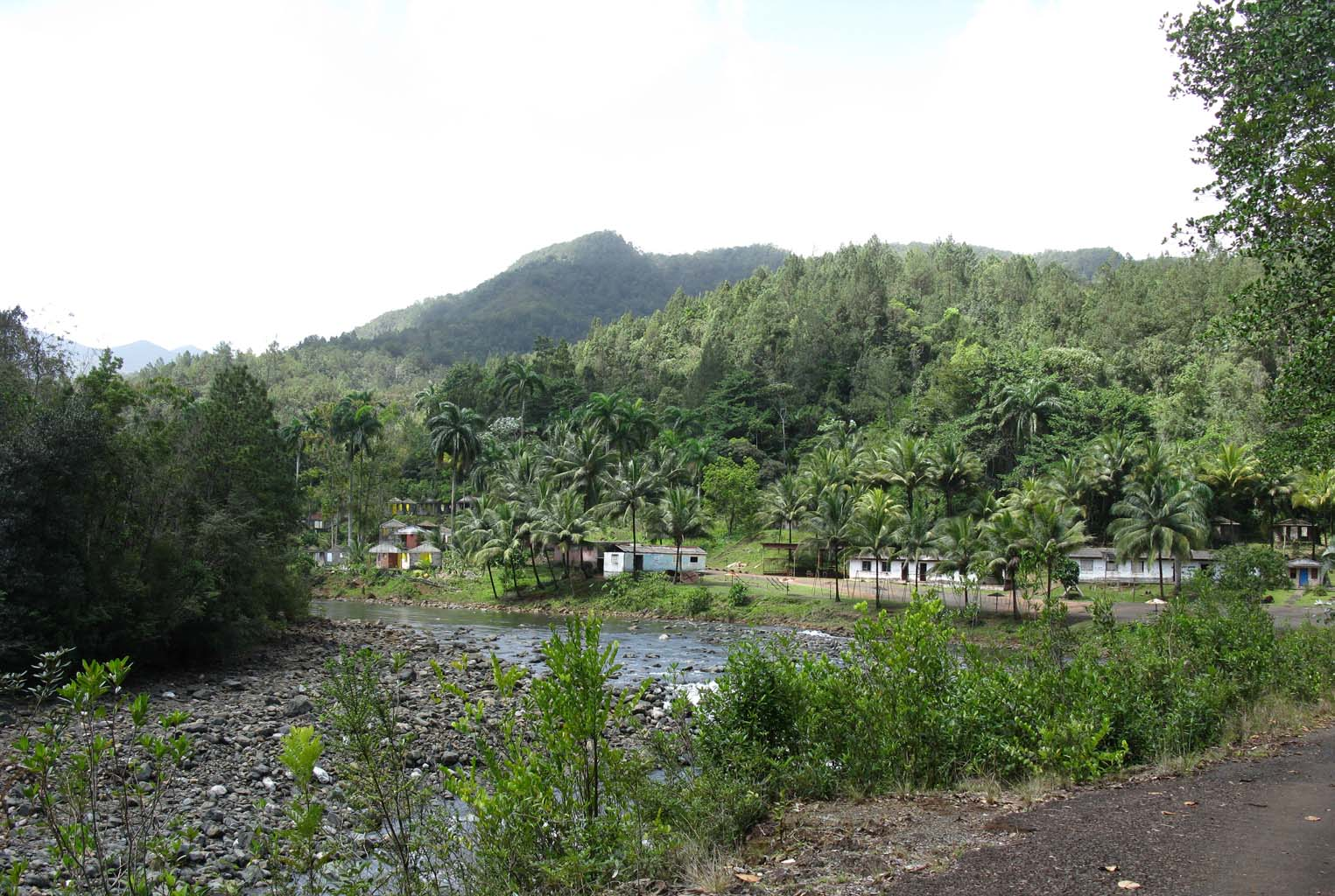
A view of Cayo Guam, in municipal inland rural territory

== Personalities ==
- Addys Mercedes (b. 1973), singer

== See also ==
- List of cities in Cuba
- Municipalities of Cuba
