= Guardalavaca =

- Village
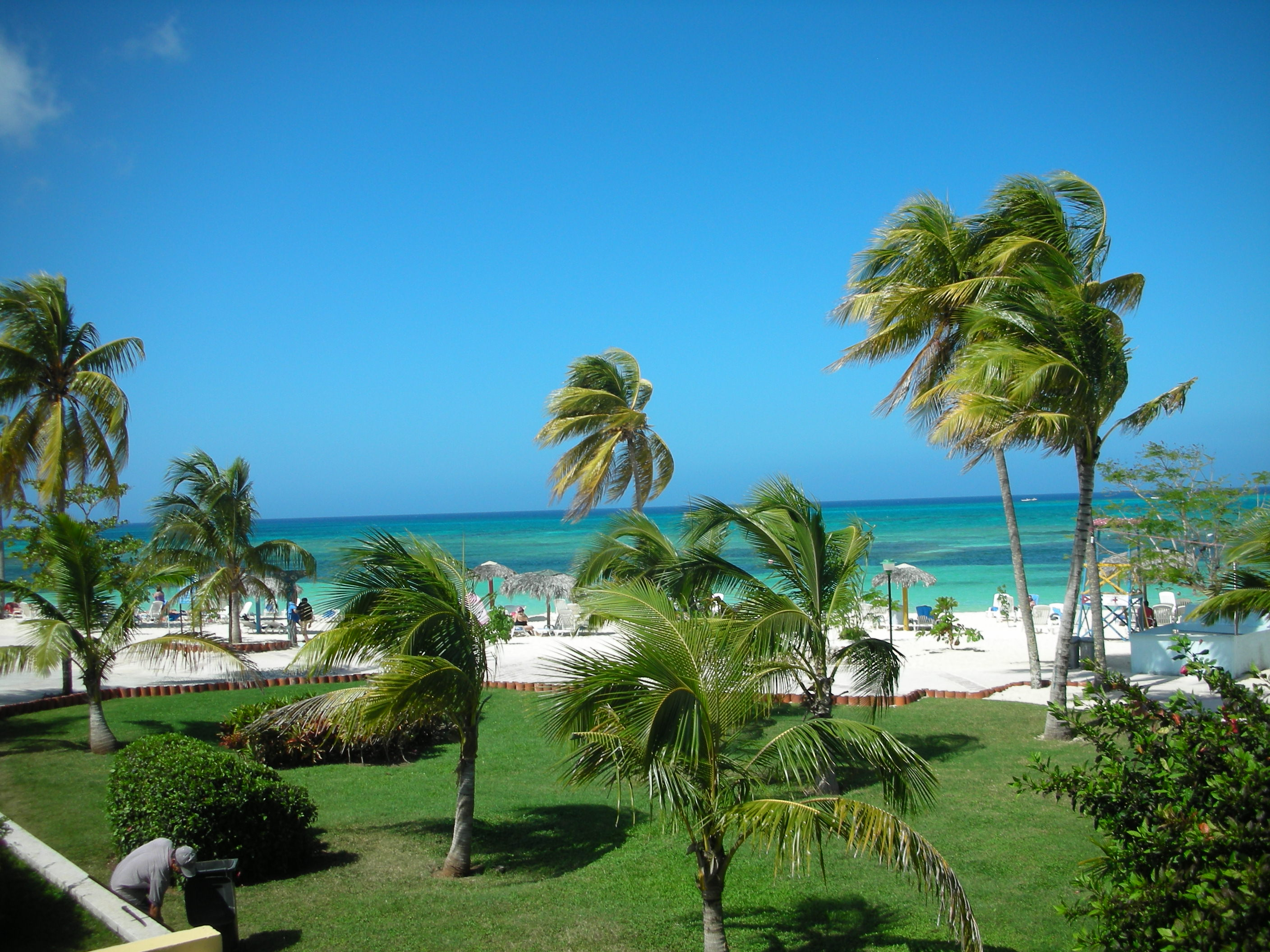
- Beach at Guardalavaca

- Location of Guardalavaca in Cuba
- Coordinates: 21°07′30″N 75°49′44″W
- Country: Cuba
- Province: Holguín
- Municipality: Banes
- Elevation: 5 m (16 ft)

Population
  - Total: 4,704
- Time zone: UTC-5 (EST)
- Area code: +53-24

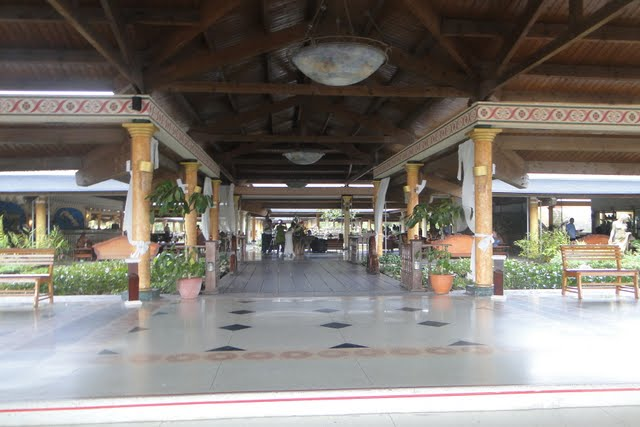
Hotel Playa Pesquero in Guardalavaca

Guardalavaca is a town in the Holguín Province of Cuba. It is a tourist location due to its white sandy beaches and warm waters. Guardalavaca beach is protected by a large coral reef and is visited by both local Cubans and tourists. Most Cuban workers in the all-inclusive hotels are transported daily in buses from neighbouring cities like Holguin, Banes, and Rafael Freyre, as only a few Cubans live in Guardalavaca due to the small size of the resort. Between Guardalavaca and Playa Esmeralda are dry tropical forest where endemic Cuban birdlife like hummingbirds Cuban emerald can be seen. Endemic Cuban knight anole lizards are numerous in these forest.

A daily flea market is popular for handmade Cuban souvenirs and tourists from beaches further away from Guardalavaca centre like Playa Esmeralda and Playa Pesquero come here on excursion. A main tourist attraction is the Taino museum and museum village between Guardalavaca and Banes, and the wildlife trail at Bahia de Naranjo. Bahia de Naranjo also offers swimming with dolphins and a small zoo. Frank Pais Airport is situated approximately 1 hour drive south of the resort and is a reason this area was developed for beach-tourism. Ecotourism and Wildlife tourism trips to Baracoa Tropical Rainforest use the large mass-tourism all-inclusive resorts of the Guardalavaca area due to their convenient location near Frank Pais Airport.

== Geography ==
It is located on the northern shore of Cuba, bordering Bahia de Naranjo (Orange Bay), and is part of the municipality of Banes. Beaches in Guardalavaca include the main Guardalavaca Beach, as well as a number of smaller beaches located west and east of the main beach. Several beaches west of Guardalavaca have also been developed for tourism but there is not abundant housing for local population and little infrastructure outside of the hotels.

These beaches include 3 resort areas. Five km to the west is Playa Esmeralda, and several smaller beaches at Bahia de Naranjo nature reserve. Ten km to the west are Playa Yuraguanal and Playa Pesquero. All of these beaches feature coral sand and are protected by coral reefs and feature all-inclusive hotels.

== History ==
=== Naming ===
"Guardalavaca" literally means "guard the cow" in Spanish. There are several accounts as to how this name may have originated; one version maintains that Guardalavaca is a malapropism for its original name Guardalabarca, meaning "guard the boat". The area was once heavily targeted by sea pirates, and Bahía de Naranjo near what is now the town of Guardalavaca is a secluded shallow bay connected to the open sea by a narrow inlet, which made it a proper safe haven to guard ships against pirates. On the other hand, the name may have originated from pirates going after the cattle grazing in the area. As pirates were spotted, the local farmers would thus shout, "Guarda la vaca" - guard the cow.

The Cuban government has attempted on several occasions to change the name of the area as they deem it not to be very appealing; they have so far been unsuccessful.
