= Frank País, Cuba =

Frank País
- Municipality
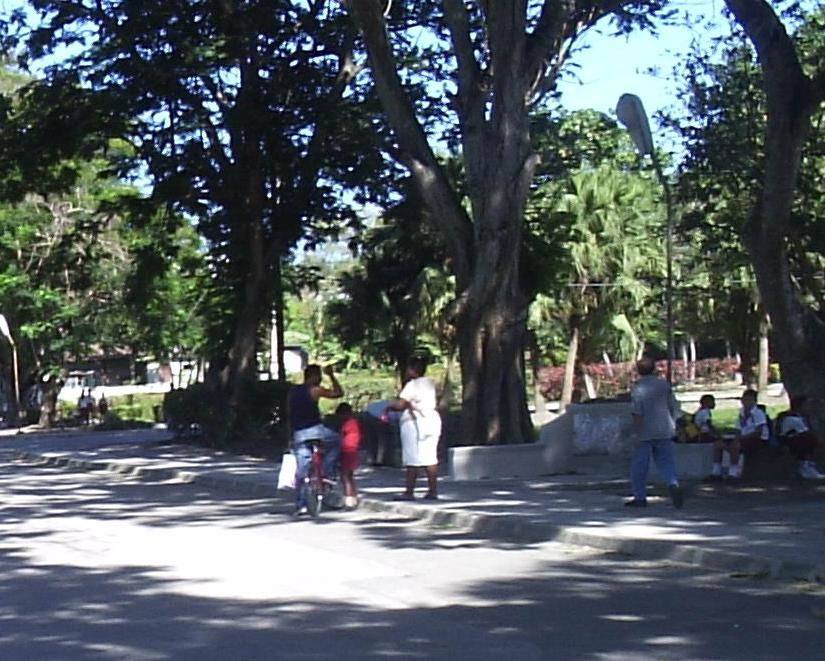
- Calle Libertad in Cayo Mambí

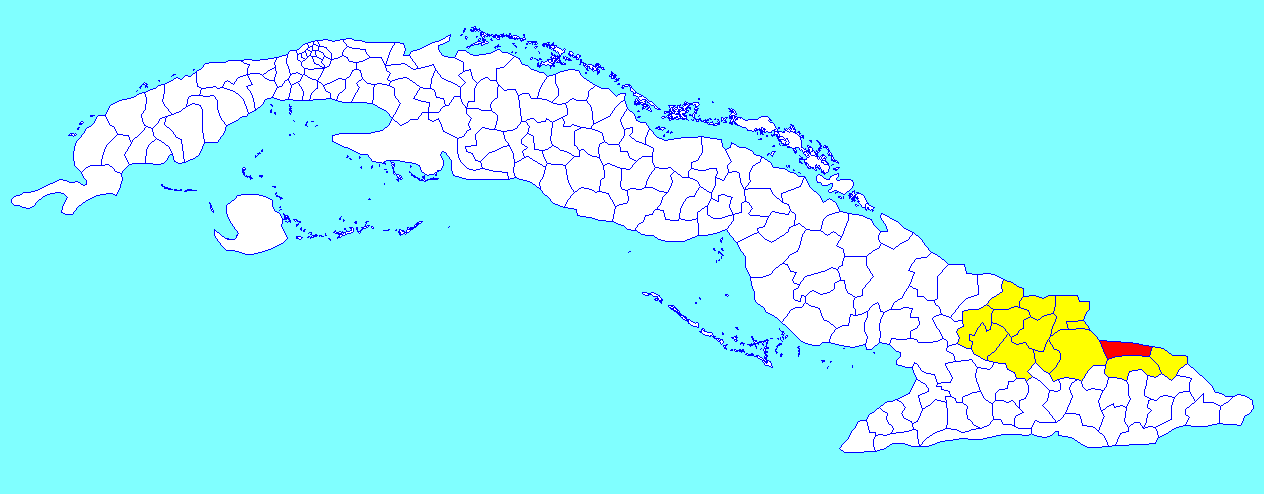
- Frank País municipality (red) within Holguín Province (yellow) and Cuba
- Coordinates: 20°39′53″N 75°16′53″W
- Country: Cuba
- Province: Holguín
- Seat: Cayo Mambí

Area
  - Total: 510 km^{2} (200 sq mi)
- Elevation: 2 m (6.6 ft)

Population (2022)
  - Total: 22,286
  - Density: 44/km^{2} (110/sq mi)
- Time zone: UTC-5 (EST)
- Area code: +53-24
- Website: https://www.cayomambi.gob.cu/es/

Frank País is a municipality in the Holguín Province of Cuba. The municipal seat is located in the town of Cayo Mambí. The municipality was named for the revolutionary Frank País.

== Demographics ==
In 2022, the municipality of Frank País had a population of 22,286. With a total area of 510 km^{2} (200 sq mi), it has a population density of 44/km^{2} (110/sq mi).

== See also ==
- List of cities in Cuba
- Municipalities of Cuba
