= Gibara =

- Municipality
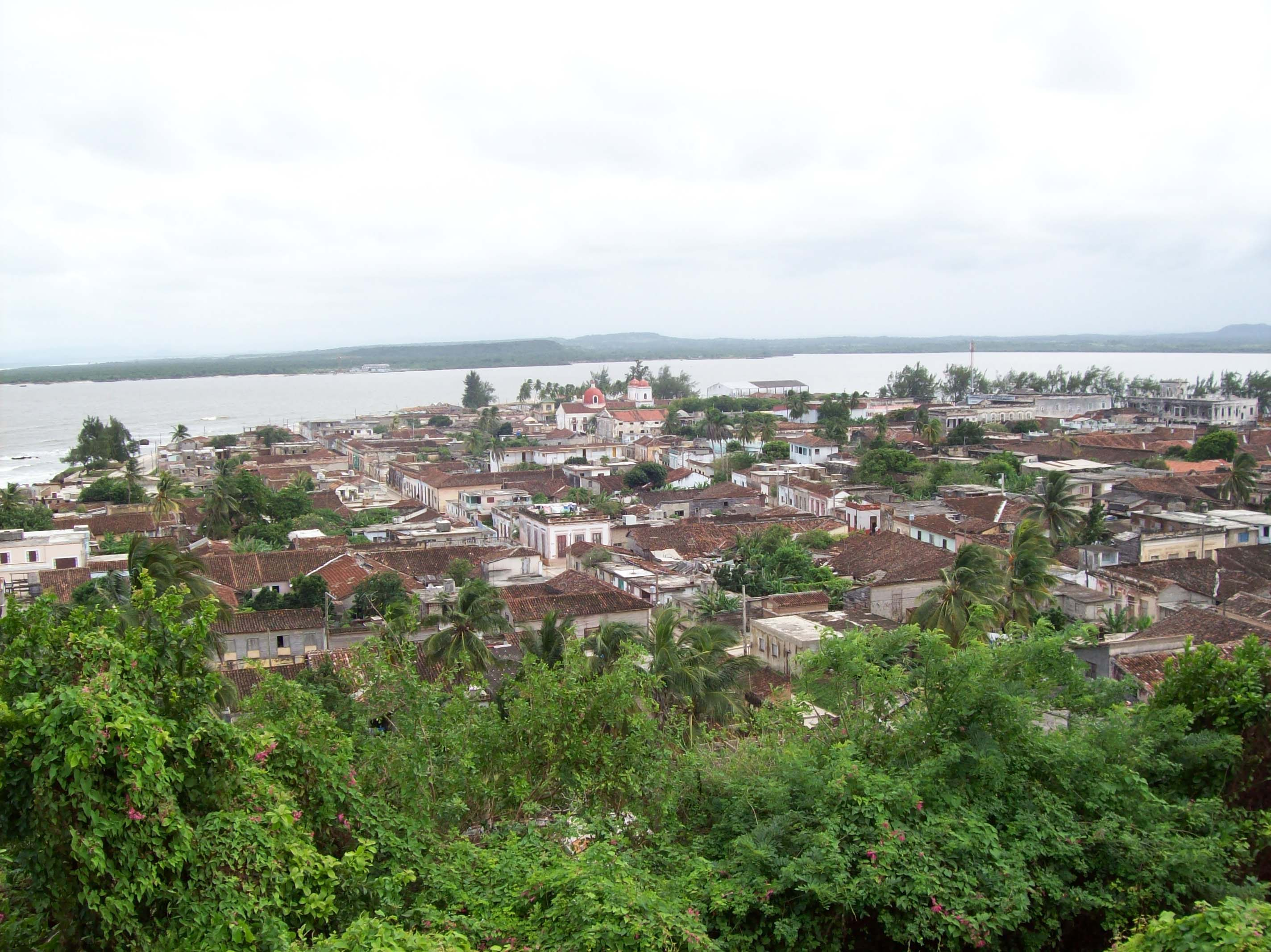

- Coat of arms
- Nickname: La Villa Blanca de los Cangrejos
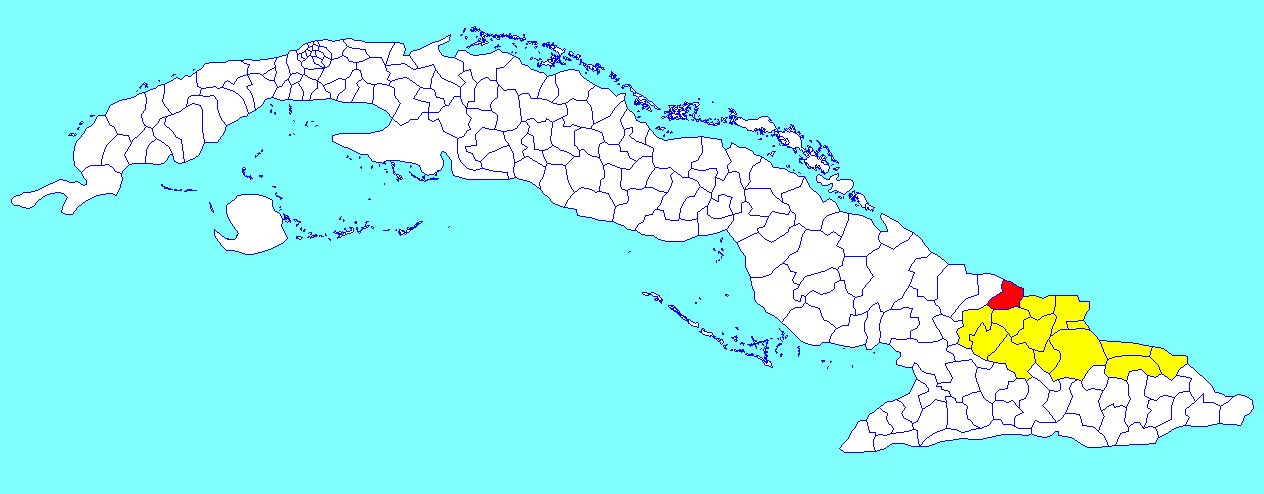
- Gibara municipality (red) within Holguín Province (yellow) and Cuba
- Coordinates: 21°06′26″N 76°08′12″W
- Country: Cuba
- Province: Holguín
- Established: 1817

Government
  - Vice-President: Sonia Adelaida Chacón Fernández

Area
  - Total: 630 km^{2} (240 sq mi)
- Elevation: 45 m (148 ft)

Population (2022)
  - Total: 69,451
  - Density: 110/km^{2} (290/sq mi)
- Time zone: UTC-5 (EST)
- Area code: +53-24

Gibara (Spanish pronunciation: [xiˈβaɾa]) is a town and municipality of the Province of Holguín in the Republic of Cuba. Gibara is the fourth largest town by population and the ninth by area in Holguín.

== Demographics ==
In 2022, the municipality of Gibara had a population of 69,451. With a total area of 630 km^{2} (240 sq mi), it has a population density of 110/km^{2} (280/sq mi).

The municipality is divided into the barrios of Arroyo Blanco, Blanquizal, Bocas, Candelaria, Cantimplora, Cupeycillos, Palmita, and Rabón.

== See also ==
- List of cities in Cuba
- Municipalities of Cuba
