= North Sea flood of 2007 =

European windstorm which affected northern and western Europe in early November 2007

Cyclone Tilo
- Tilo over the North Sea on 8 November 2007 Countries affected by the North Sea flood of 2007

Meteorological history
- Formed: 6 November 2007
- Dissipated: 11 November 2007

Extratropical cyclone
- Lowest pressure: 974 hPa (28.8 inHg)

Overall effects
- Areas affected: Belgium, Denmark, Germany, Netherlands, Norway and United Kingdom

Cyclone Tilo (also known as Cyclone Andrea in Norway) was a European windstorm which affected northern and western Europe in early November 2007. Combining with the remnants of Hurricane Noel, Tilo's storm surge led to the North Sea flood of 2007, affecting the coastlines of the Netherlands, the United Kingdom, Germany, Denmark, Norway and Belgium, starting on the night of 8–9 November 2007.

== Meteorological history ==
Cyclone Tilo absorbed the extratropical remnants of ex-Hurricane Noel on 7 November, before rapidly intensifying, which paved the way for the stronger upstream storm Tilo. The jet stream was diverted to the north by a strong ridge of high pressure to the west of Ireland in the Atlantic Ocean, forcing the jet stream over the north of Greenland and back towards Europe. The unusually long fetch was considered important in the potential destructiveness of the storm, stretching down from the Norwegian Sea into the North Sea before reaching the east coast of England and the Dutch and German coasts. In combination with a high tide, the tidal level was expected to exceed 3 metres (9.8 ft) above normal sea levels.

== Impact ==
The flood and waves were expected to overwhelm sea defences and cause extensive flooding; in particular, the coasts of Norfolk and Kent. However, in the event, the storm surge was 20 centimetres (7.9 in) less than forecast, and damage was relatively minor. The water level came to just 10 cm below the top of the sea wall surrounding Great Yarmouth.

Flood warnings were issued for the east coast of Britain and the entire Dutch coast. The Maeslantkering in the port city of Rotterdam was closed for the first time since its construction in 1997. Denmark and Germany issued severe gale warnings for winds gusts up to 125 km/h (78 mph), and the Scottish islands of Orkney and Shetland expected winds gusts up to 145 km/h (90 mph). Oil platforms off the coast of Norway were also closed for the duration of the storm. Felixstowe docks were closed and trains services were suspended between Lowestoft and Norwich due to flooding of the line.

In Scotland all schools in Orkney were closed with some closures also in Caithness and Sutherland. Wind gusts as high as 100 miles per hour (160 km/h) were reported, along with early snow for the Scottish highlands. The Northlink ferry company cancelled sailings between the Northern Isles. Caledonian MacBrayne also cancelled a dozen routes to the Western Isles. 4000 homes lost power in Grampian; there were also reports of trees and roofs being blown down. A rescue tug was called on to stand by a 240-foot (73 m) cargo ship struggling in the sea off Shetland. The A90 road was closed between Aberdeen and Peterhead after a lorry was blown over. A double-decker bus was blown off the road near Mintlaw in Aberdeenshire. There were also reports of a roof blown off in Fraserburgh.

== Aftermath ==
One other consequence of the storm was a record influx of little auks (a small Arctic seabird) into the North Sea, with a count of 18,371 from the Farne Islands on 9 November as they returned north, nearly double the previous record count, then further counts there of 7,143 on 10 November and 28,803 on 11 November.

North Norfolk District Council were left seeking to apply for compensation from the government's Bellwin scheme for natural disasters. Replacing damaged promenade handrails was estimated to cost £20,000, while council-owned beach chalets were estimated to cost more than £40,000 to mend. Inspections were also undertaken of the steel under Cromer pier, where waves had damaged the floor of the Pavilion Theatre.

== Gallery ==
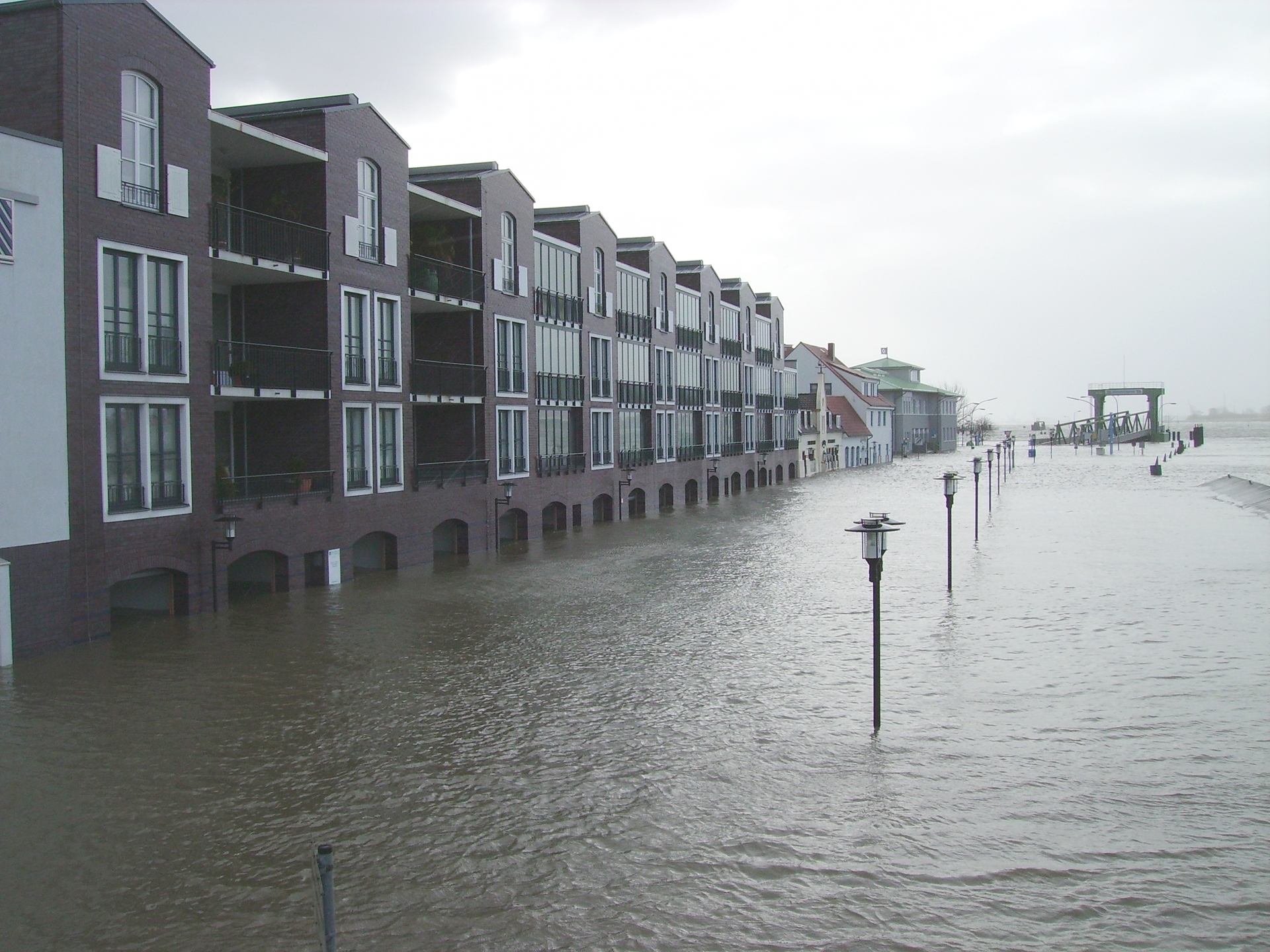
Flooding in Bremerhaven

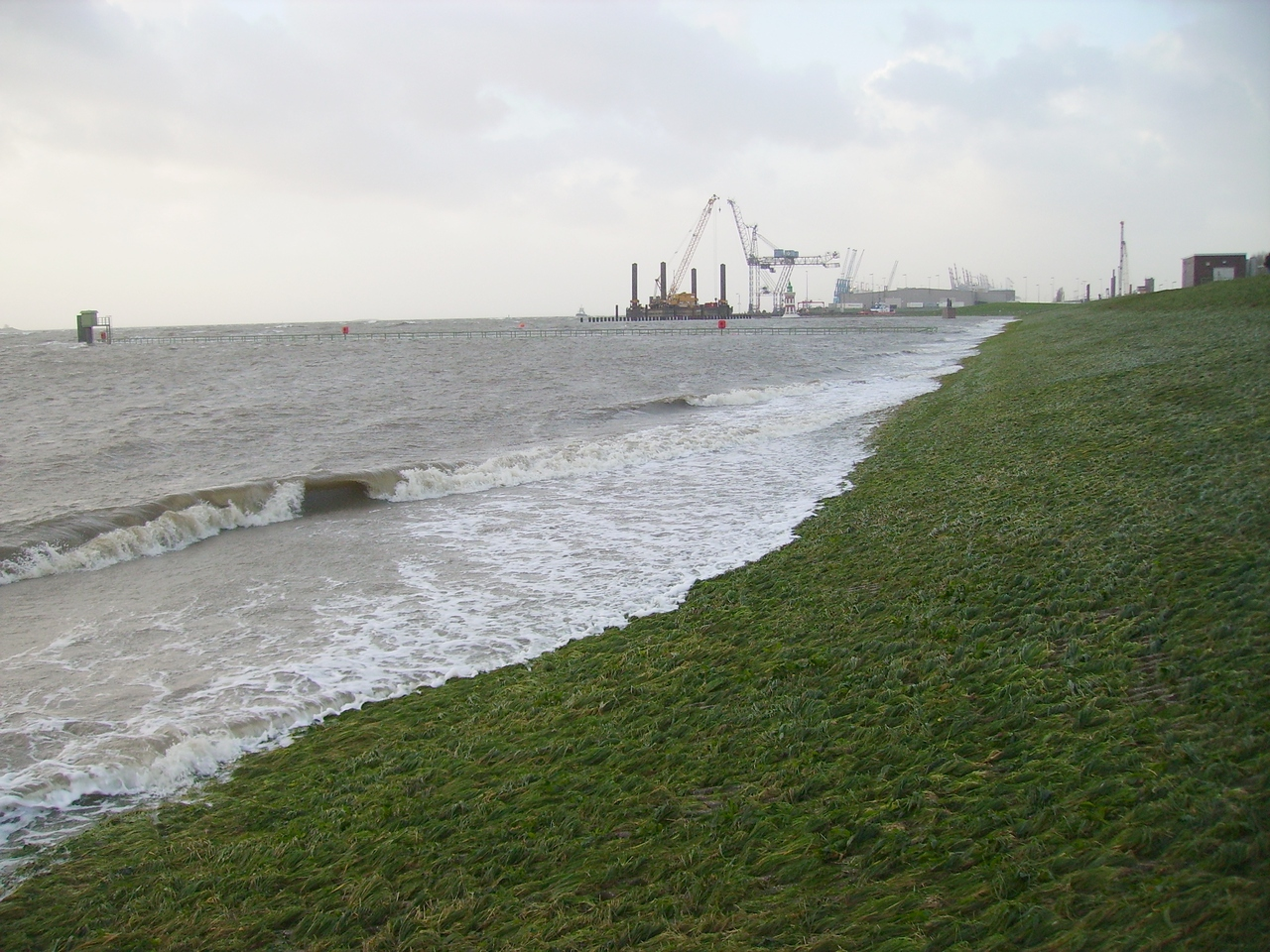
Northern dike Bremerhaven

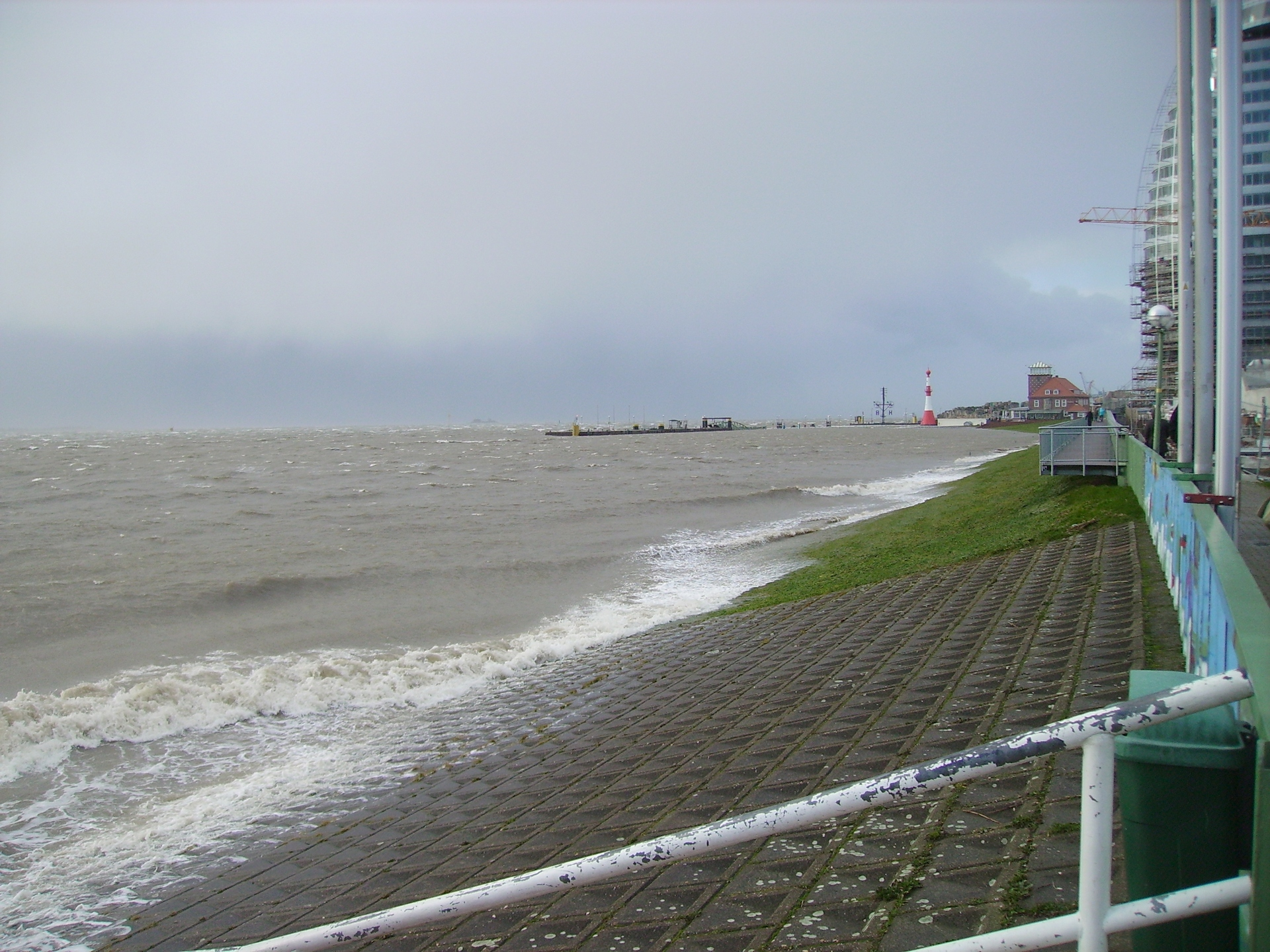
Weser dike Bremerhaven

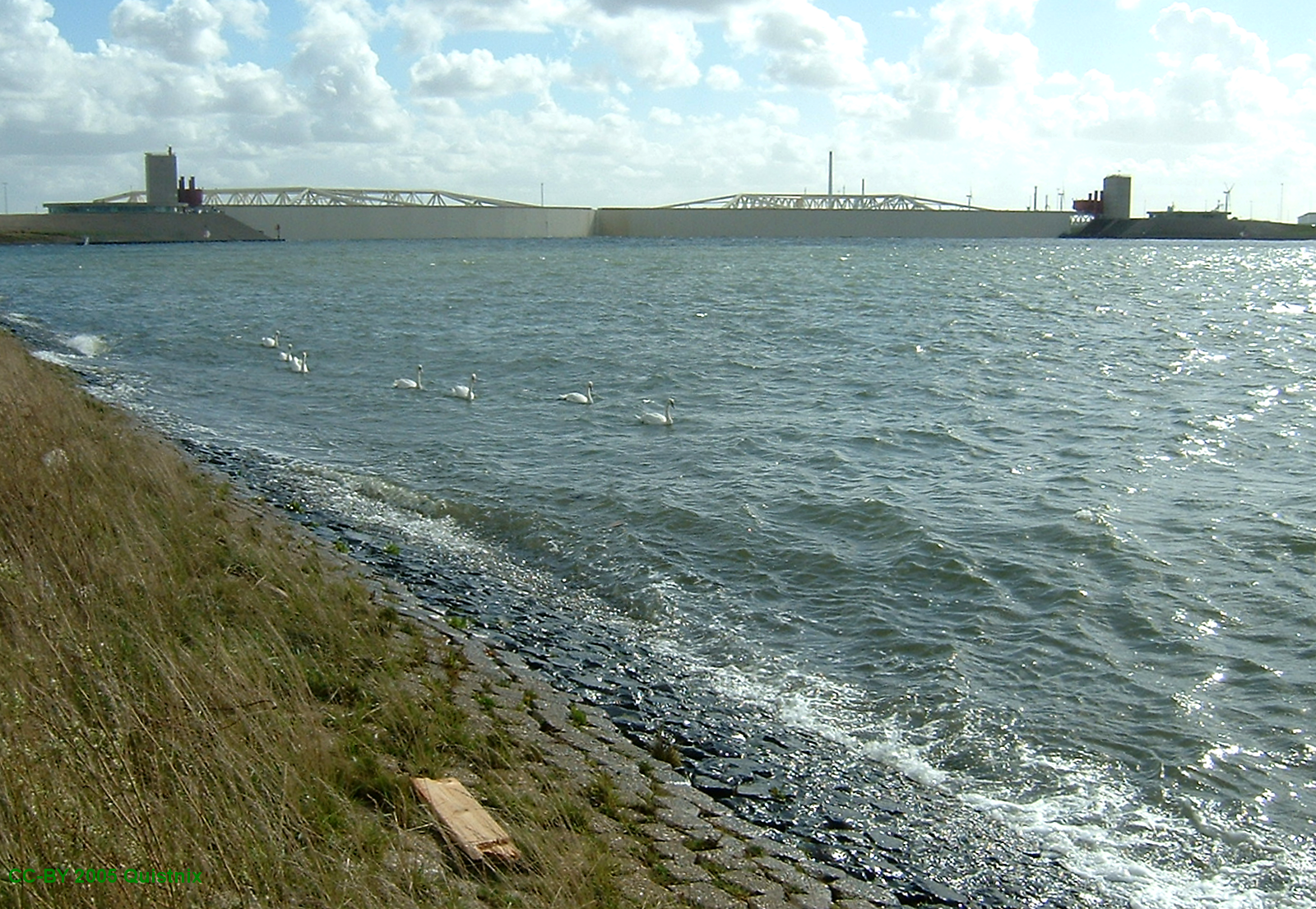
Closed Maeslantkering barrier

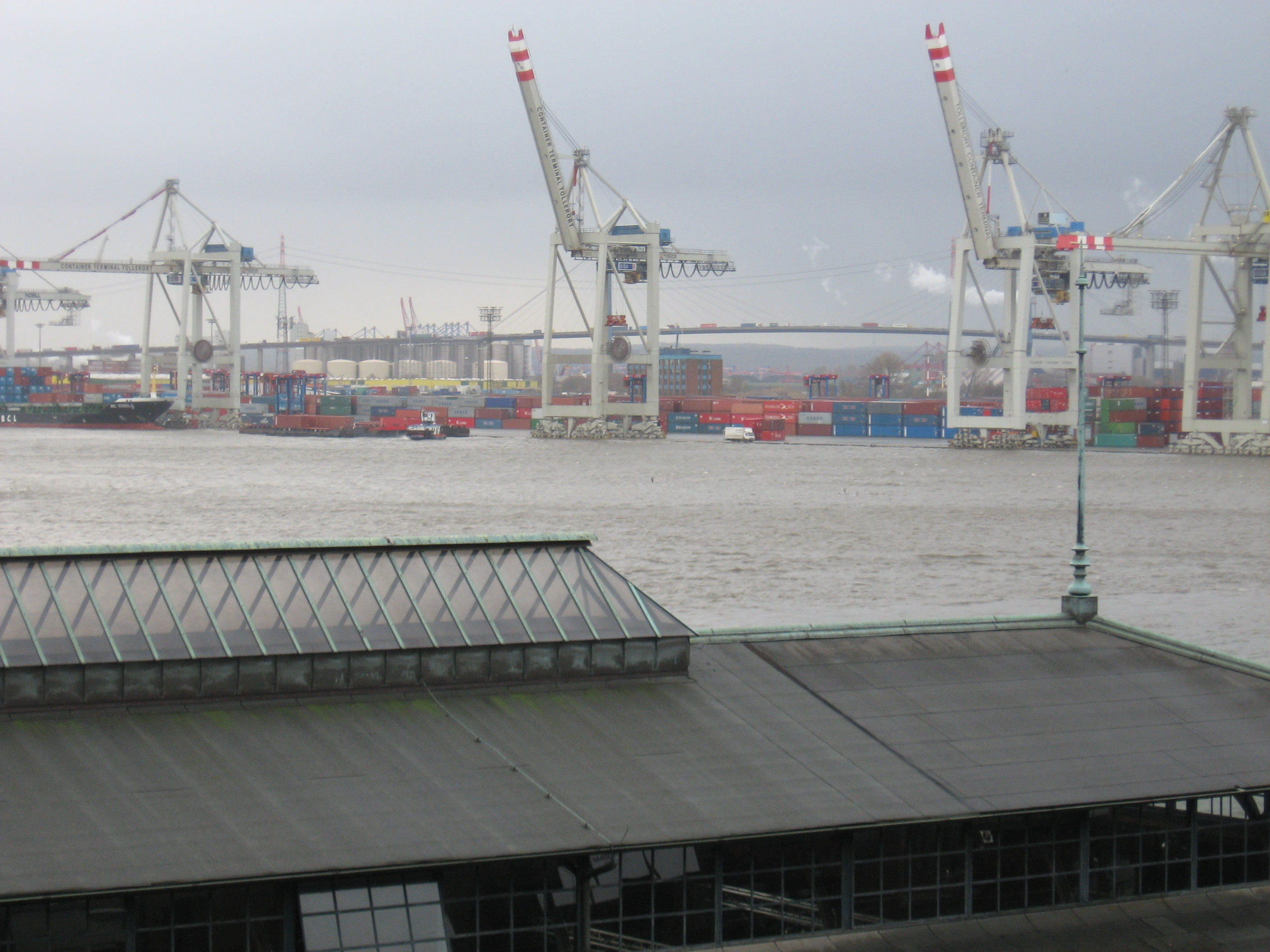
High water, Hamburg container port

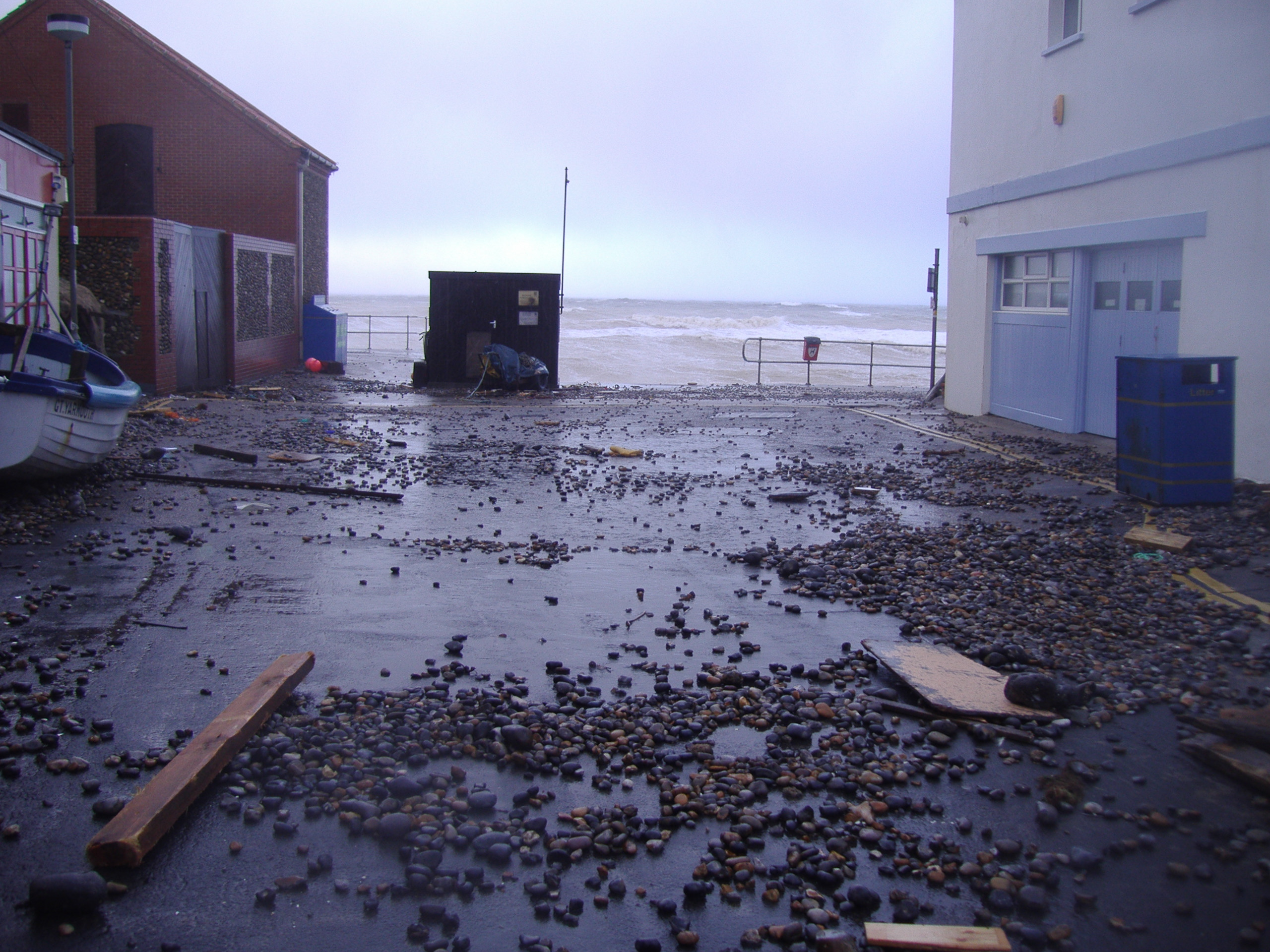
Flotsam washed up on the sea front at Sheringham, Norfolk, hours after the surge
