= Holguín Province =

Province of Cuba

- Province of Cuba
- Country: Cuba
- Capital: Holguín

Area
  - Total: 9,209.71 km^{2} (3,555.89 sq mi)

Population (2010-12-31)
  - Total: 1,037,161
  - Density: 112.616/km^{2} (291.674/sq mi)
- Time zone: UTC-5 (EST)
- Area code: +53-024
- ISO 3166 code: CU-11
- HDI (2019): 0.762 high · 13th of 16
- Website: www.Holguín.cu

Holguín (Spanish pronunciation: [olˈɣin]) is one of the provinces of Cuba, the third most populous after Havana and Santiago de Cuba. It lies in the southeast of the country. Its major cities include Holguín (the capital), Banes, Antilla, Mayarí, and Moa.

The province has a population of slightly over one million people. Its territory exceeds 9,300 km^{2} (3,600 sq mi), 25 percent of which is covered by forest.

== History ==
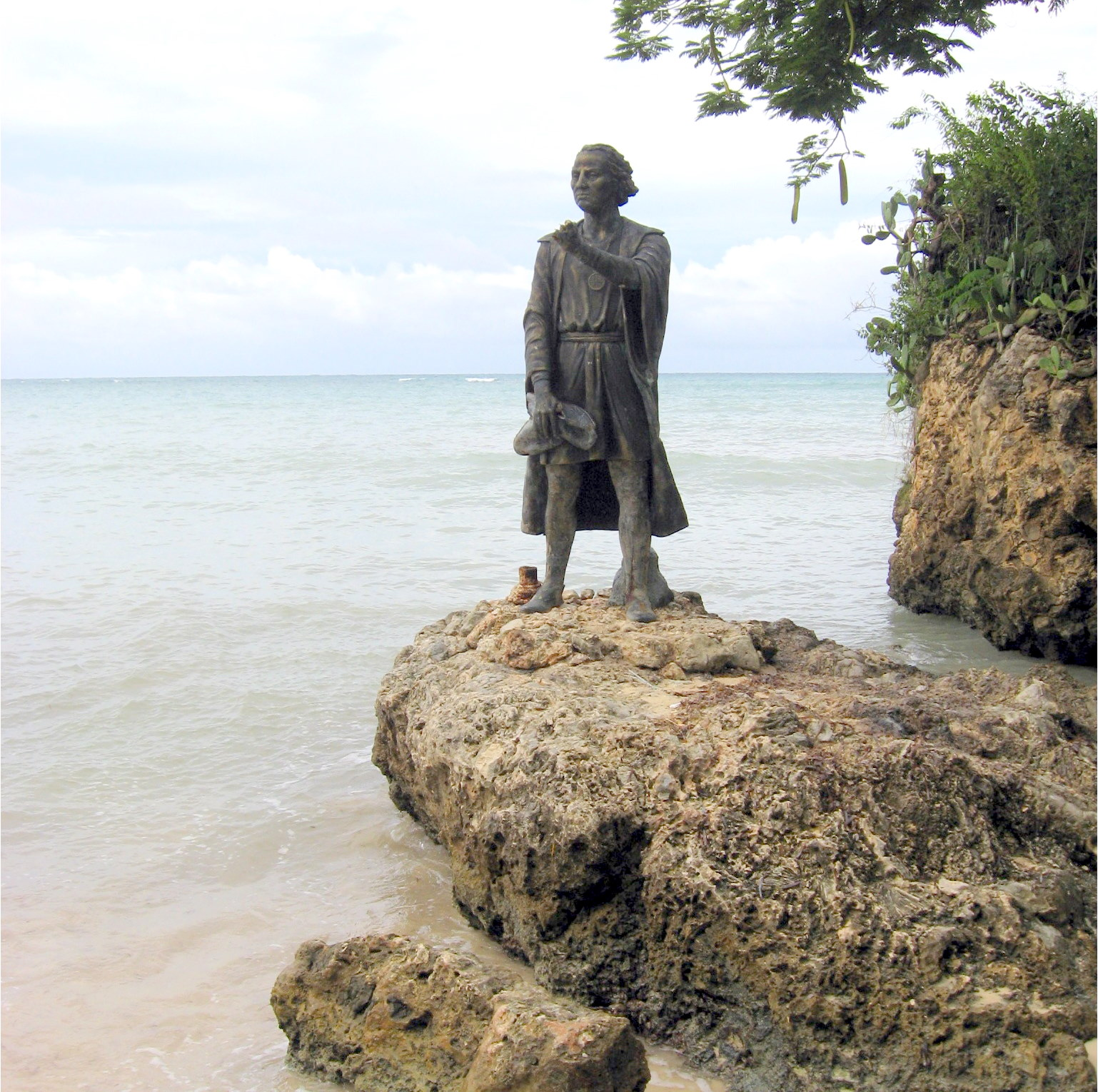
Statue of Christopher Columbus near Guardalavaca

Christopher Columbus landed in what is believed to have been today's Holguín province on October 27, 1492. He declared that it was "the most beautiful land human eyes had ever seen".

The Holguín province was established in 1978, when it was split from the Oriente region.

== Economy ==
Like much of Cuba, Holguín's economy is based around sugarcane, though other crops such as corn and coffee, as well as mining, are also large earners for the province.

A large nickel plus cobalt processing plant with shipping facilities was built in Moa, using foreign investment, much of it from Canada. Chromium, iron and steel plants dot the province as well.

Tourism has only recently begun to be developed, offering beach resorts in the outskirts of the region, with a number of hotels around the Guardalavaca area, Playa Esmeralda, Playa Yuraguanal, Playa Blanca, Playa Pesquero, and Cayo Saetia. The Cuchillas del Toa Biosphere Reserve, Sierra Cristal National Park and Alejandro de Humboldt National Park are partly located in the province. Gibara is a little visited historical port located west of the main Guardalavaca resorts. Recently a large number of tourists are reported to have visited the city and its rich culture and beauty. Direct flights to Canada and Europe from Holguin airport limit transfer time to around 1 hour to most resorts on the Costa Holguinera. Canadians and Europeans share the coral beaches with Cubans.

== Municipalities ==
Holguín is divided into 14 municipalities:

| Municipality | Population (2004) | Population (2012) | Area (km^{2}) | Location | Remarks |
|---|---|---|---|---|---|
| Antilla | 12,222 | 12,415 | 100 | 20.84861°N 75.75250°W | |
| Báguanos | 52,854 | 50,700 | 806 | 20.76306°N 76.02944°W | Correct name: Báguano |
| Banes | 81,274 | 79,856 | 781 | 20.97000°N 75.71139°W | |
| Cacocum | 42,623 | 41,558 | 661 | 20.74389°N 76.32417°W | |
| Calixto García | 57,867 | 55,622 | 617 | 20.85417°N 76.60194°W | Buenaventura |
| Cueto | 34,503 | 32,999 | 326 | 20.64833°N 75.93167°W | |
| Frank País | 25,621 | 24,334 | 510 | 20.66472°N 75.28139°W | Cayo Mambí |
| Gibara | 72,810 | 71,991 | 630 | 21.10722°N 76.13667°W | |
| Holguín | 326,740 | 346,195 | 666 | 20.88889°N 76.25722°W | Provincial Capital |
| Mayarí | 105,505 | 102,354 | 1,307 | 20.65944°N 75.67778°W | |
| Moa | 71,079 | 75,020 | 730 | 20.64000°N 74.91750°W | |
| Rafael Freyre | 50,080 | 52,699 | 620 | 21.02833°N 75.99639°W | Santa Lucia |
| Sagua de Tánamo | 52,013 | 48,213 | 704 | 20.58611°N 75.24167°W | |
| Urbano Noris | 43,892 | 41,116 | 846 | 20.60139°N 76.13250°W | San German |

Source: Population from 2004 and 2012 Census. Area from 1976 municipal re-distribution.

== Demographics ==
In 2004, the province of Holguin had a population of 1,029,083. With a total area of 9,292.83 km^{2} (3,587.98 sq mi), the province had a population density of 110.7/km^{2} (287/sq mi).

Per the 2012 census, the population was 1,035,072, and a similar population density of 111.38/km^{2} (288.5/sq mi).

== Notable people ==
- Fulgencio Batista, last president and military dictator of the Republican era (1902-1959)
- Ángel Castro y Argiz, farmer and businessman, father of Fidel, Juanita, Ramón and Raúl Castro
- Fidel Castro, former President of Cuba
- Juanita Castro, former revolutionary, activist and writer
- Ramón Castro Ruz, revolutionary and politician
- Raúl Castro, former President of Cuba
- Rolando Masferrer, politician and business man
- Augusto Martinez Sánchez, revolutionary and former Minister of Labor.
- Aroldis Chapman, left-handed pitcher for the Boston Red Sox
- Frank Fernández, pianist
- Calixto García, General in the three liberation wars of Cuba
- Mario Kindelán two times lightweight boxing Olympic champion in 2000 and 2004
- Faustino Oramas, musician
- Marcos A. Rodriguez, entrepreneur and broadcaster
- Manuel Galban, musician; guitar, pianist and arranger

== See also ==
- Oriente
