= 2007 Atlantic hurricane season =

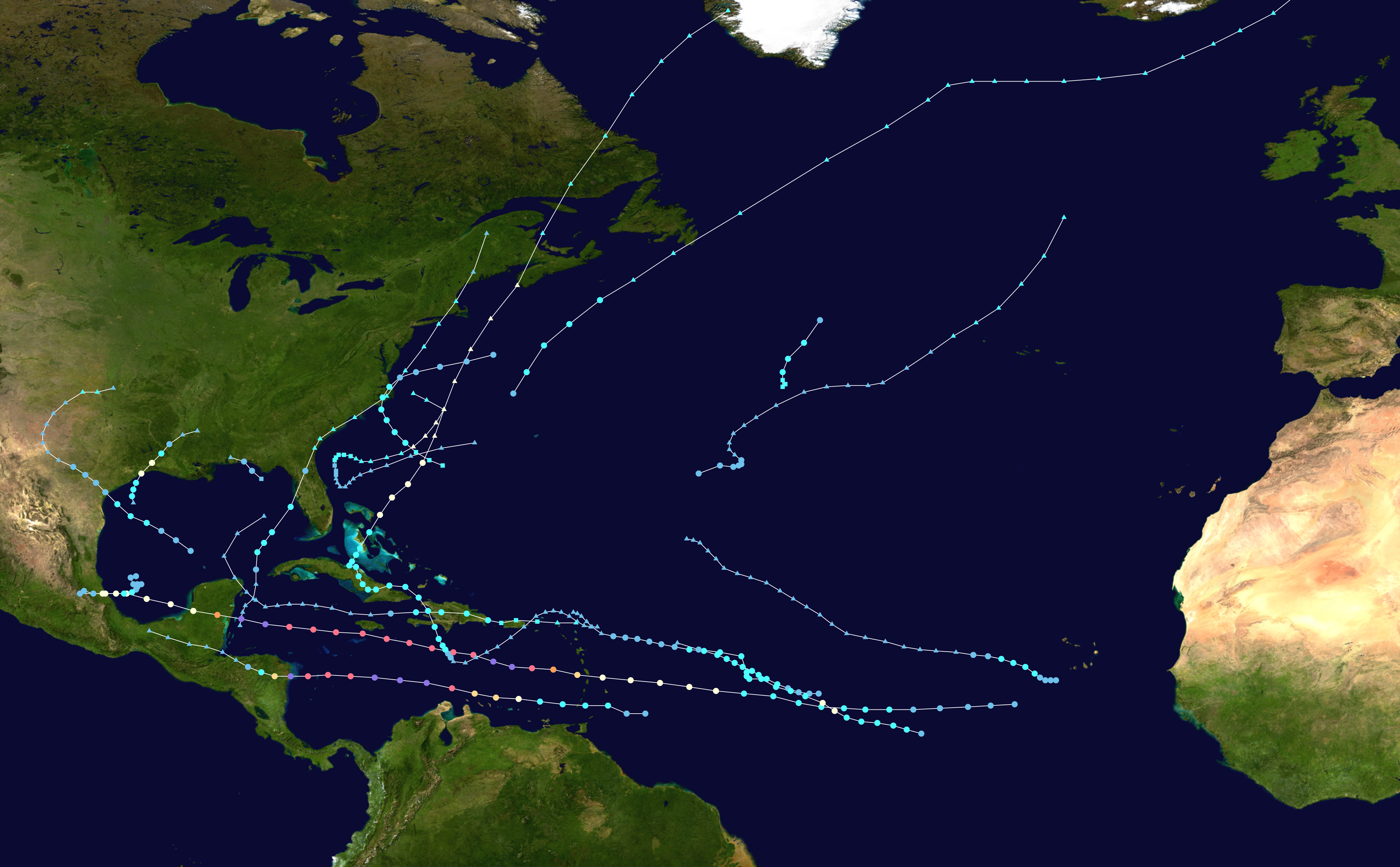
- Season summary map

Seasonal boundaries
- First system formed: May 9, 2007
- Last system dissipated: December 13, 2007

Strongest storm
- Name: Dean
  - Maximum winds: 175 mph (280 km/h) (1-minute sustained)
  - Lowest pressure: 905 mbar (hPa; 26.72 inHg)

Seasonal statistics
- Total depressions: 17
- Total storms: 15
- Hurricanes: 6
- Major hurricanes (Cat. 3+): 2
- ACE: 73.9
- Total fatalities: 416+
- Total damage: ≥ $3.244 billion (2007 USD)

Related articles
- Timeline of the 2007 Atlantic hurricane season; 2007 Pacific hurricane season; 2007 Pacific typhoon season; 2007 North Indian Ocean cyclone season

The 2007 Atlantic hurricane season was the first season since 2003 to feature tropical activity both before and after the official bounds of the season. Although there were an above-average number of named storms during the season – 15, most of them were weak and short-lived. Despite the predominance of weak systems, this was the first season on record to feature more than one Category 5 landfalling hurricane. It produced 17 tropical cyclones, 15 tropical storms, six hurricanes, and two major hurricanes. It officially started on June 1 and ended on November 30, dates which conventionally delimit the period during which most tropical cyclones form in the Atlantic Ocean, although as shown by Subtropical Storm Andrea and Tropical Storm Olga in early May and early December, respectively, the formation of tropical cyclones is possible at any time of the year. The first system, Subtropical Storm Andrea, developed on May 9, while the last storm, Tropical Storm Olga, dissipated on December 13. The most intense hurricane, Dean, was, at the time, the third most intense landfalling Atlantic storm on record. It was the second on record in which an Atlantic hurricane, Felix, and an eastern Pacific hurricane, Henriette, made landfall on the same day. September had a then record-tying eight storms, until it was surpassed in 2020. However, the strengths and durations of most of the storms were low.

Pre-season forecasts by Colorado State University called for 14 named storms and 7 hurricanes, of which three were expected to attain major hurricane status. The National Oceanic and Atmospheric Administration (NOAA) later issued its initial forecast, which predicted 13 to 17 named storms, 7 to 10 hurricanes and three to five major hurricanes. After several revisions in the projected number of storms, NOAA and CSU lowered their forecasts by the middle of the season.

Several storms made landfall or directly affected land. Hurricanes Dean and Felix made landfall at Category 5 intensity, causing severe damage in parts of Mexico and Central America, respectively. Both storm names, as well as Noel, the name of a hurricane that affected the Caribbean, were retired from the naming list of Atlantic hurricanes. The United States was affected by five cyclones, although the storms were generally weak; three tropical depressions and only two tropical storms, Barry and Gabrielle, and one hurricane, Humberto, made landfall in the country. Elsewhere, three storms directly affected Canada, although none severely. The combined storms killed at least 416 people and caused about $3.24 billion (2007 USD, 5.04 billion 2026 USD) in damage. (Note: The cumulative damage figures were obtained by summing the damage figures on the individual Tropical Cyclone Reports referenced throughout the article, with the exception of Hurricane Dean. Dean's damage figures were obtained by adding the per-country totals referenced in the Impact section of this article.)

== Seasonal forecasts ==
Predictions of tropical activity in the 2007 season
Source	Date	Named storms	Hurricanes	Major hurricanes
CSU	Average (1950–2000)	9.6	5.9	2.3
NOAA	Average (1950–2005)	11.0	6.2	2.7
Record high activity		30	15	7
Record low activity		1	0	0
CSU	December 8, 2006	14	7	3
CSU	April 3, 2007	17	9	5
NOAA	May 22, 2007	13–17	7–10	3–5
CSU	May 31, 2007	17	9	5
UKMO	June 19, 2007	10*	N/A	N/A
CSU	August 3, 2007	15	8	4
NOAA	August 9, 2007	13–16	7–9	3–5
CSU	September 4, 2007	15	7	4
CSU	October 2, 2007	17	7	3
Actual activity		15	6	2
* July–November only: 12 storms observed in this period.

Philip J. Klotzbach, William M. Gray, and their associates at Colorado State University issue forecasts of hurricane activity each year, separately from NOAA. Klotzbach's team, formerly led by Gray, determined the average number of storms per season between 1950 and 2000 to be 9.6 tropical storms, 5.9 hurricanes, and 2.3 major hurricanes (storms exceeding Category 3 on the Saffir–Simpson scale). A normal season, as defined by NOAA, has 9 to 12 named storms, of which five to seven reach hurricane strength, and one to three become major hurricanes.

=== Pre-season forecasts ===
On December 8, 2006, Klotzbach's team issued its first extended-range forecast for the 2007 season, predicting above-average activity (14 named storms, seven hurricanes, three of Category 3 or higher). It listed a 64 percent chance of at least one major hurricane striking the U.S. mainland. This included a 40 percent chance of at least one major hurricane strike on the East Coast, including the Florida peninsula, and a 40 percent chance of at least one such strike on the Gulf Coast from the Florida Panhandle westward. The potential for major hurricane activity in the Caribbean was forecast to be above average, and the team predicted that El Niño, associated with reduced hurricane activity in the Atlantic, would dissipate by the active portion of the season.

On April 3 a new forecast was issued, calling for a very active hurricane season of 17 named storms, nine hurricanes and five intense hurricanes. The increase in the forecast was attributed to the rapid dissipation of El Niño conditions. The team also forecast a neutral or weak-to-moderate La Niña and noted that sea surface temperatures were much higher than average. The estimated potential for at least one major hurricane to affect the U.S. was increased to 74 percent; the East Coast potential increased to 50 percent, and from the Florida Panhandle westward to Brownsville, Texas, the probability rose to 49 percent. However, the team's report noted that while they predicted an active season, it was not suggesting that 2007 would be "as active as the 2004 and 2005 seasons".

=== Midseason outlooks ===
On June 19 the UK Met Office (UKMO) issued a forecast of 10 tropical storms in the July to November period with a 70 percent chance that the number would be in the range of 7 to 13. On August 3, 2007, Klotzbach's team lowered its season estimate to 15 named storms, of which eight were to become hurricanes and four to become major hurricanes. Team members noted that conditions had become slightly less favorable for storms than earlier in the year. Sea surface temperature anomalies were cooler, and several Saharan Air Layer events had suppressed development of tropical cyclones. El Niño-Southern Oscillation (ENSO) conditions were also noted to have been slightly cooler.

On August 9, 2007, NOAA revised its season estimate slightly downwards to 13 to 16 named storms, of which seven to nine were to be hurricanes, and three to five major hurricanes. However, the agency reaffirmed its prediction of an above-average season, citing warmer-than-normal sea surface temperatures in parts of the Atlantic Ocean and Caribbean and the likelihood of La Niña conditions during the peak of the season.

== Seasonal summary ==
Only two major hurricanes, storms of Category 3 intensity or higher, formed during the season, the fewest since the 1997 season. Named storms were active for 33.50 days during the season, the lowest number of active days since the 1994 season. There were only 11.25 days with active hurricanes, the lowest value since the 2002 season. Despite this, the number of days with major hurricanes was above the long-term average. Both major hurricanes, Dean and Felix, attained Category 5 status, and both made landfall at Category 5 intensity, making the 2007 season the first to feature two hurricanes doing each, both of which would not be repeated until 2017. When Hurricane Felix was upgraded to a Category 5 storm on September 2, it became the eighth to form in this basin since 2000. This gave the decade more hurricanes of such strength than any other on record. Hurricane Humberto was the first hurricane to make landfall in Texas since Hurricane Claudette in 2003.

Overall, the season's activity was reflected with a cumulative accumulated cyclone energy (ACE) rating of 73.9, which is below the long-term average of 93, and the lowest since 2002. ACE is, broadly speaking, a measure of the power of the hurricane multiplied by the length of time it existed, so storms that last a long time, as well as particularly strong hurricanes, have high ACEs. ACE is only calculated for full advisories on tropical systems at or exceeding 34 knots (39 mph; 63 km/h) or tropical storm strength. Although officially, subtropical cyclones, such as Andrea or the initial portions of Gabrielle, Jerry, and Olga, are excluded from the total, the figure above includes periods when storms were in a subtropical phase.

== Systems ==
=== Subtropical Storm Andrea ===
- Subtropical storm (SSHWS)
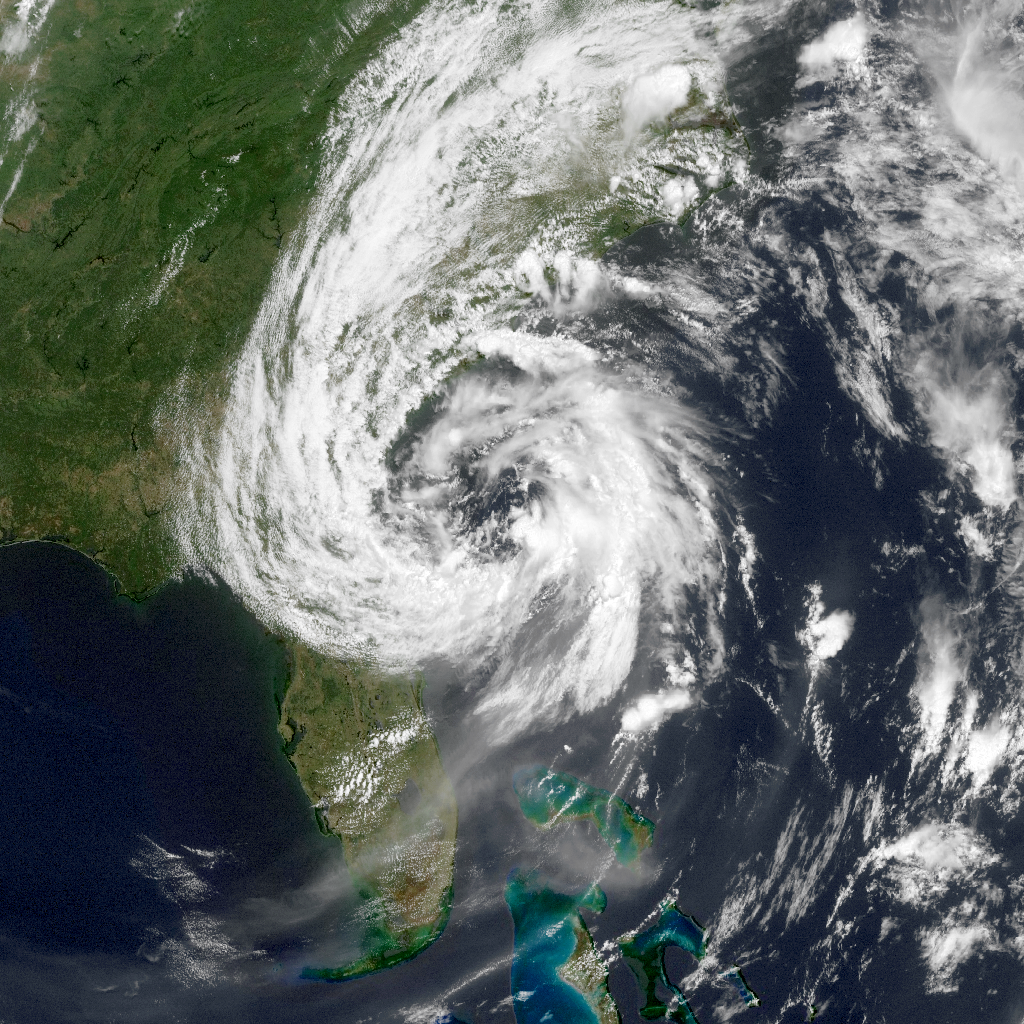
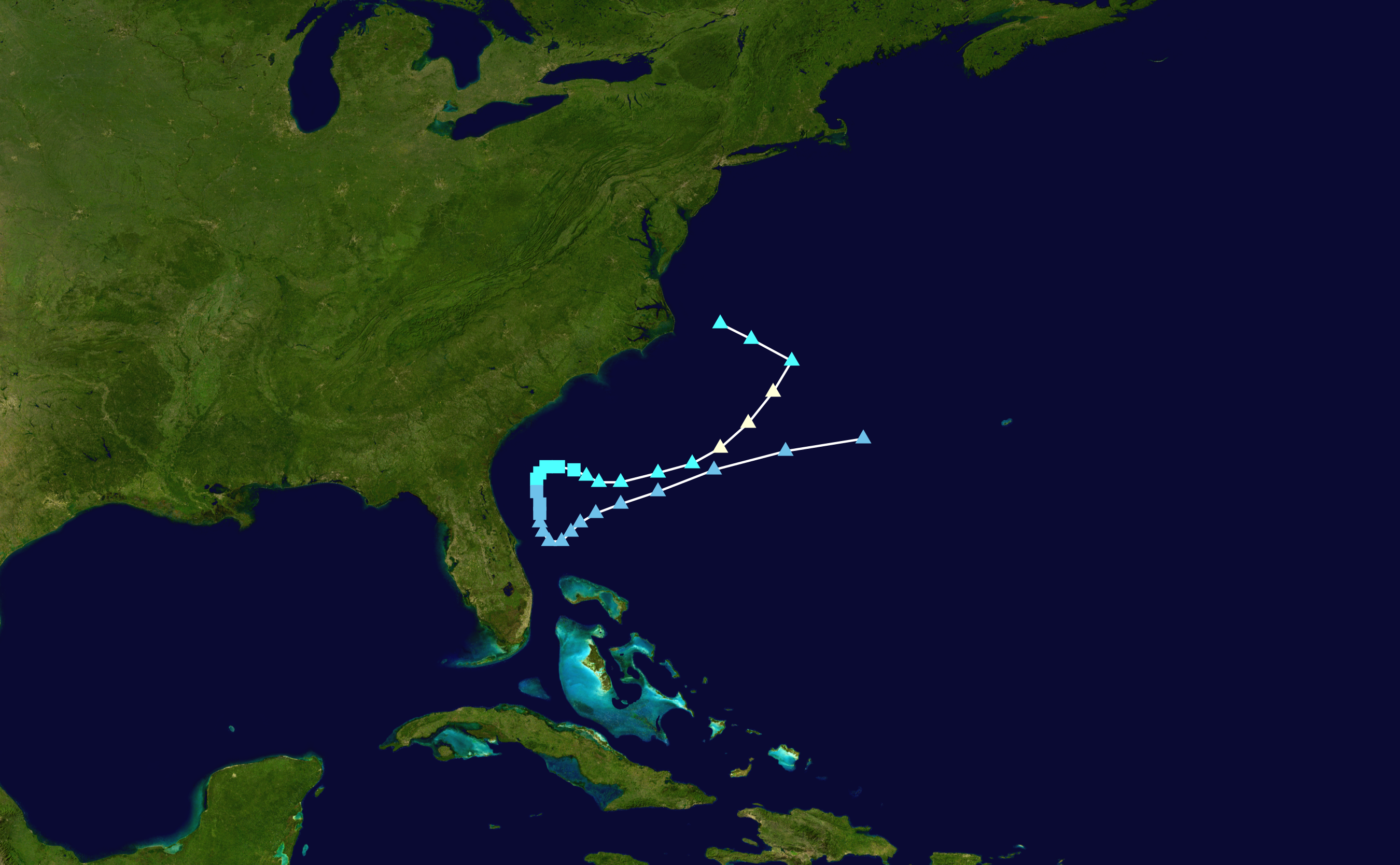
- Duration: May 9 – May 11
- Peak intensity: 60 mph (95 km/h) (1-min); 1001 mbar (hPa)

A large extratropical cyclone formed offshore the mid-Atlantic on May 6. It deepened steadily along a cold front that pushed through Florida. After losing most of its baroclinic support, development ceased until its low moved into warmer waters near the Bahamas. However, interaction between the low and a strong high-pressure system to the north generated hurricane-force winds in the system. Decreasing wind shear allowed deeper convection to develop much closer to the center. By May 9, the system had transitioned into Subtropical Storm Andrea about 140 mi (225 km) southeast of Savannah, Georgia, immediately peaking with winds of 60 mph (95 km/h) and a minimum pressure of 1,001 mbar (29.6 inHg). Andrea then moved southward into an environment with higher wind shear, weakening to a subtropical depression on May 10. The storm degenerated into a remnant low on the next day about 70 mi (115 km) east of Ponce Inlet, Florida, as all significant convection had disappeared. Following intermittent bursts of convection, an advancing cold front pushed Andrea's remnants northward and eventually absorbed the system.

Andrea was the first pre-season storm to develop since Tropical Storm Ana in April 2003 and the first Atlantic named storm in May since Tropical Storm Arlene in 1981. Because Andrea never made landfall, most of the resulting damage was associated with large waves, higher than normal tides, associated coastal flooding, and beach erosion. In North Carolina, erosion left about 70 dwellings in imminent danger, while waves covered Highway 12 with sand and washed part of it away. From North Carolina to Florida, several vessels suffered damage and a few other went capsized or were lost. Winds generated by the storm contributed to the spread of wildfires in Florida and Georgia. Six deaths occurred in the United States, all due to waves generated by Andrea's precursor. The extratropical system which developed into Andrea also produced significant swells in the Bahamas.

=== Tropical Storm Barry ===
- Tropical storm (SSHWS)
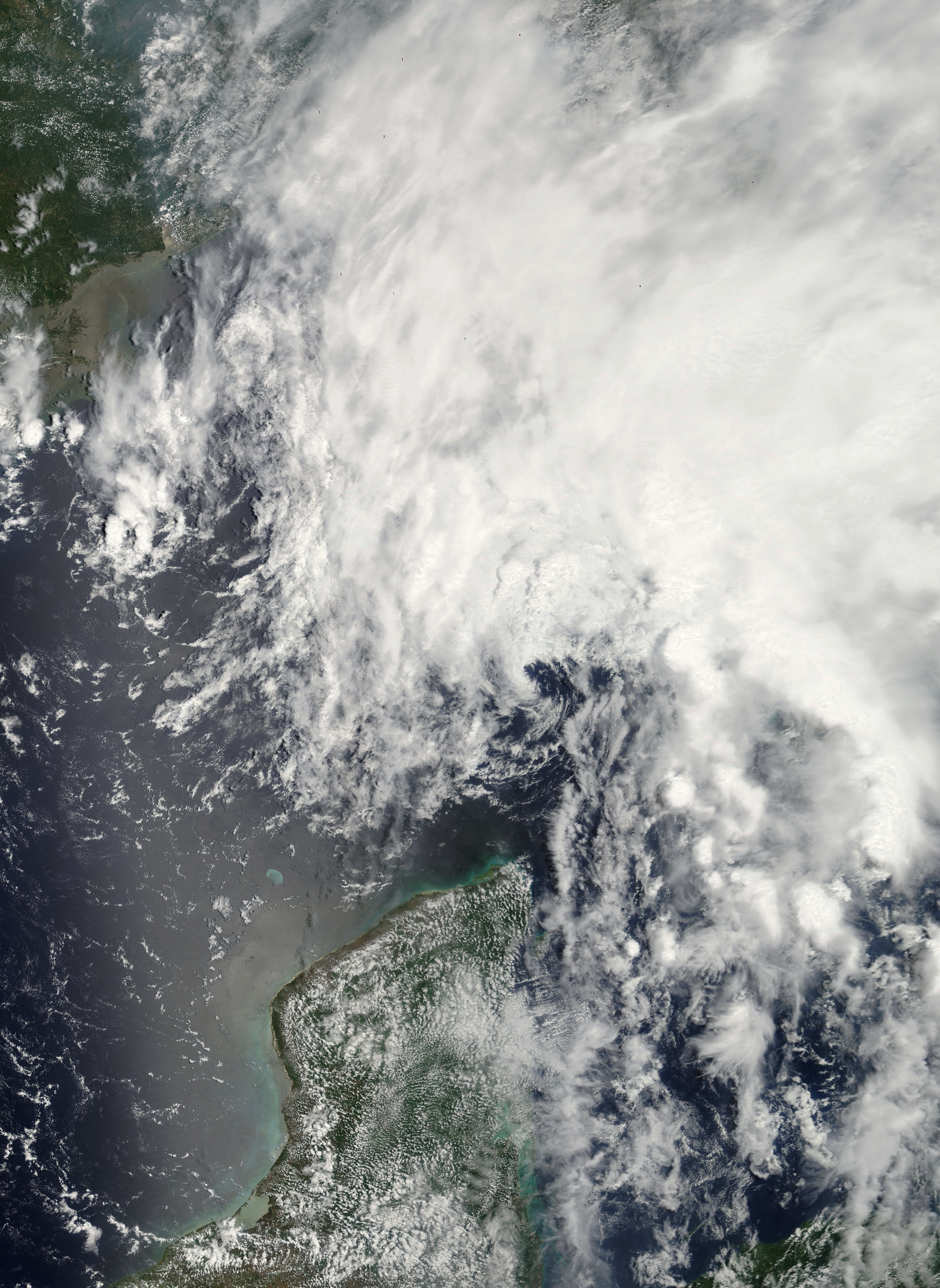
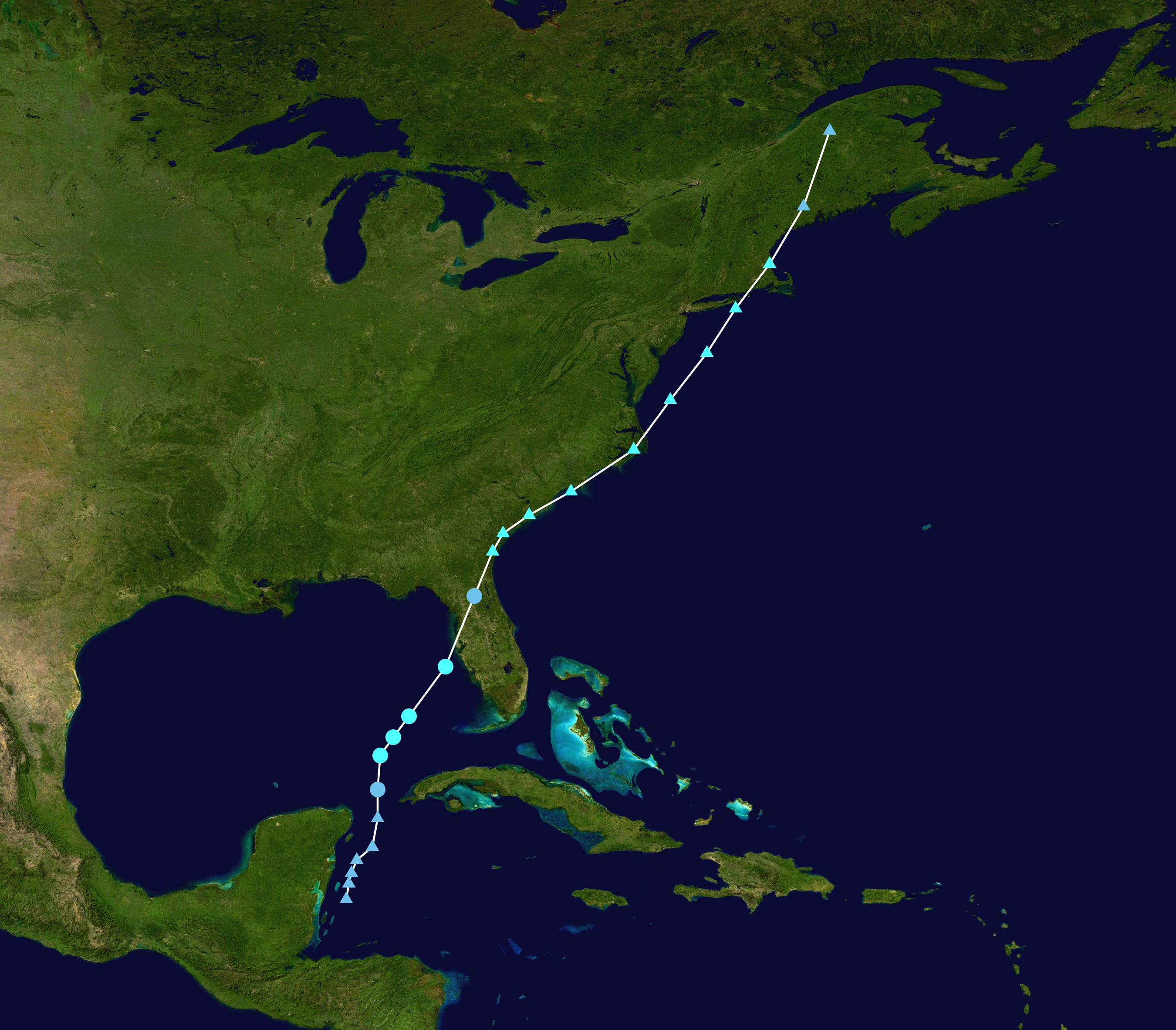
- Duration: June 1 – June 2
- Peak intensity: 60 mph (95 km/h) (1-min); 997 mbar (hPa)

On May 30, a broad low-pressure area spawned from a westward-moving tropical wave offshore the east of the Yucatán Peninsula. The low organized into a tropical depression just north of the Yucatán Channel on June 1, the first day of the hurricane season. Six hours later, the depression intensified into Tropical Storm Barry. The storm moved north-northeastward and reached its peak intensity early on June 2 with winds of 60 mph (95 km/h) and a minimum pressure of 997 mbar (29.4 inHg). However, strong wind shear weakened Barry to a tropical depression before it made landfall on Anna Maria Island, Florida, several hours later. Barry became extratropical late on June 2 over eastern Georgia, but its remnants continued up the East Coast of the United States before being absorbed by a larger extratropical cyclone over eastern Quebec on June 5.

The precursor to Barry dropped heavy rains in parts of Cuba, with Sancti Spíritus Province recording up to 12 in (300 mm). More than 2,000 people fled their homes after streets flooded and waterways swelled. In Florida, the rainfall resulted in slick roads, which caused two traffic-related deaths, and a woman was killed after being injured by rough surf. Barry spawned a few tornadoes in the state, damaging a few homes and powe lines and knocking down some trees and fences. Up to 8 in (200 mm) of rain fell in Georgia at Mount Vernon, which was mostly beneficial due to assisting firefights with their response to the Bugaboo Fire. The remnants of Barry also caused some instances of flooding farther north and more than 60 traffic accidents in Virginia, resulting in 10 injuries. Damage from Barry and its remnants totaled around $118,000.

=== Tropical Storm Chantal ===
- Tropical storm (SSHWS)
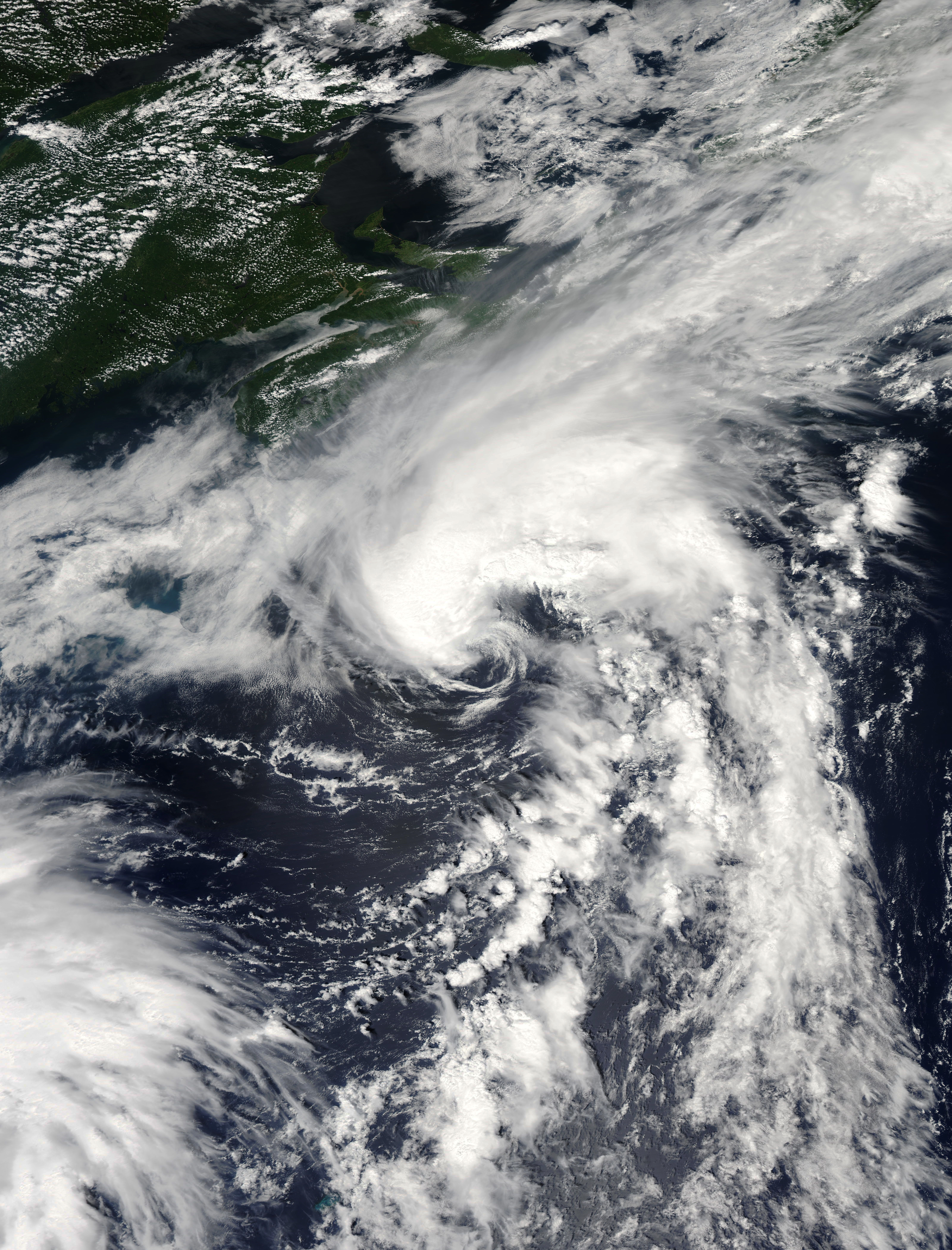
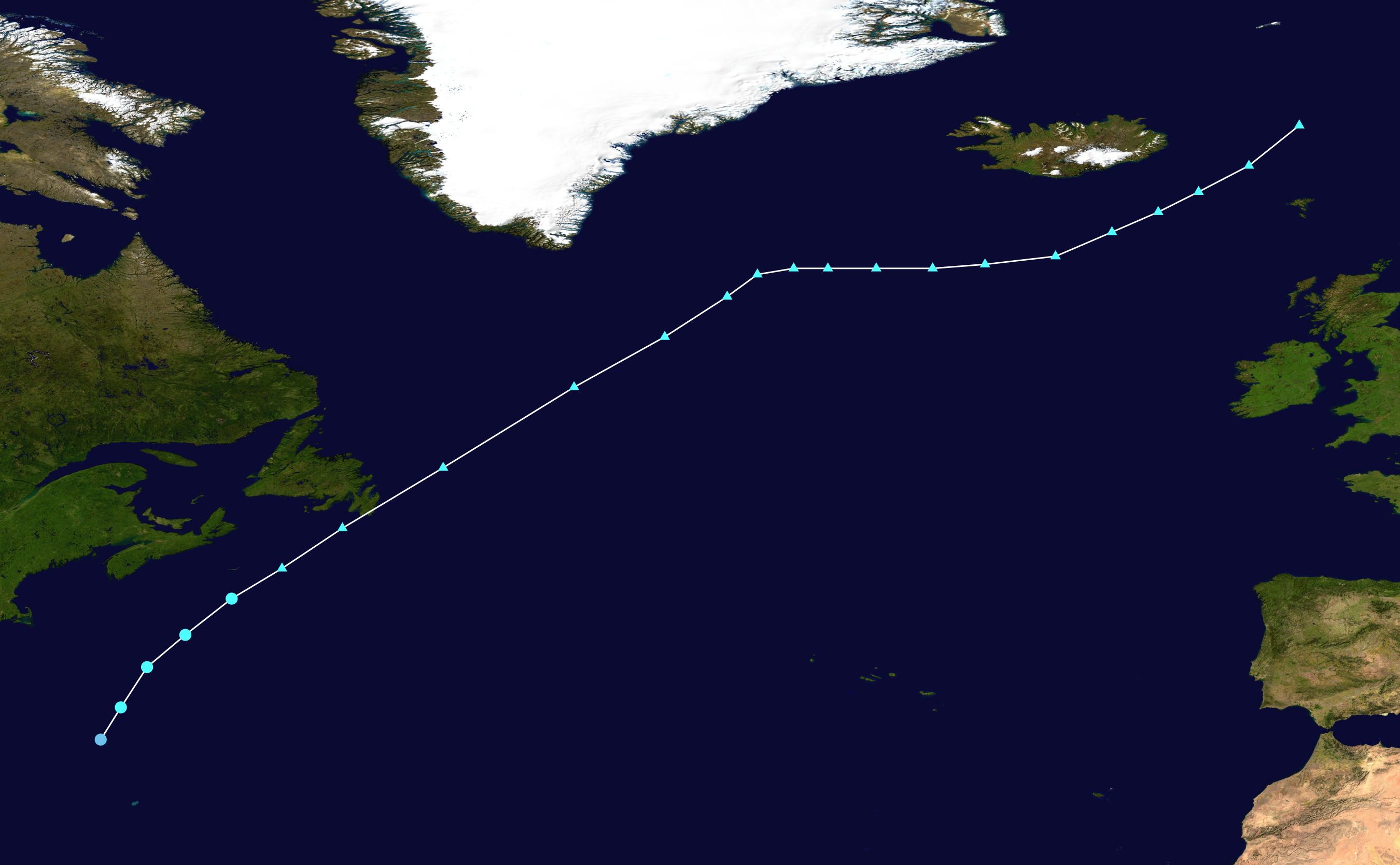
- Duration: July 31 – August 1
- Peak intensity: 50 mph (85 km/h) (1-min); 994 mbar (hPa)

A frontal system moved off the Carolinas on July 21 and degenerated into a surface trough. After remaining nearly stationary northeast of the Bahamas, the system began organizing on July 28 as the motion became more northerly. On July 30, the low passed to the west of Bermuda as the thunderstorms became more organized. On July 31, Tropical Depression Three developed about 270 miles (430 km) north-northwest of Bermuda. Convection increased further over the center, and at around 06:00 UTC on July 31 the depression intensified into Tropical Storm Chantal. The storm continued northeastward, under the influence of a mid-level trough, and quickly reached peak winds of 50 mph (80 km/h). The storm tracked through an area of progressively cold waters and cooler air, causing Chantal to weaken. On August 1, the storm transitioned into an extratropical storm within the approaching cold front. Midday on August 1, the cyclone struck Newfoundland along the Avalon Peninsula, hitting the Placentia Area with full force. It subsequently intensified to attain winds of near hurricane-force. On August 3 the cyclone underwent a final weakening trend in the far northern Atlantic Ocean, and on August 5 the extratropical remnants of Chantal merged with another extratropical cyclone to the east of Iceland.

On Bermuda, the L.F. Wade International Airport recorded 2.12 in (54 mm) of precipitation, which represented about 35% of rainfall observed there in July 2007. The remnants of Chantal moved over the Avalon Peninsula of Newfoundland, producing wind gusts of 55 mph (88 km/h) at Cape Pine. Rainfall reached 7.89 in (200 mm) of rain fell in Argentia. Some homes suffered water damage and 10 communities became isolated after bridges and roads were washed out. Insured damage across the area totaled $25 million (2007 CAD, $24.3 million 2007 USD). The flooding led to a state of emergency. In Ship Harbour citizens were isolated for 5 days until a temporary road was made. Also in Spaniard's Bay, the flooding caused a bridge to depress about 1.5 feet (46 cm); The storm caused the annual Royal St. John's Regatta to be postponed.

=== Hurricane Dean ===
- Category 5 hurricane (SSHWS)
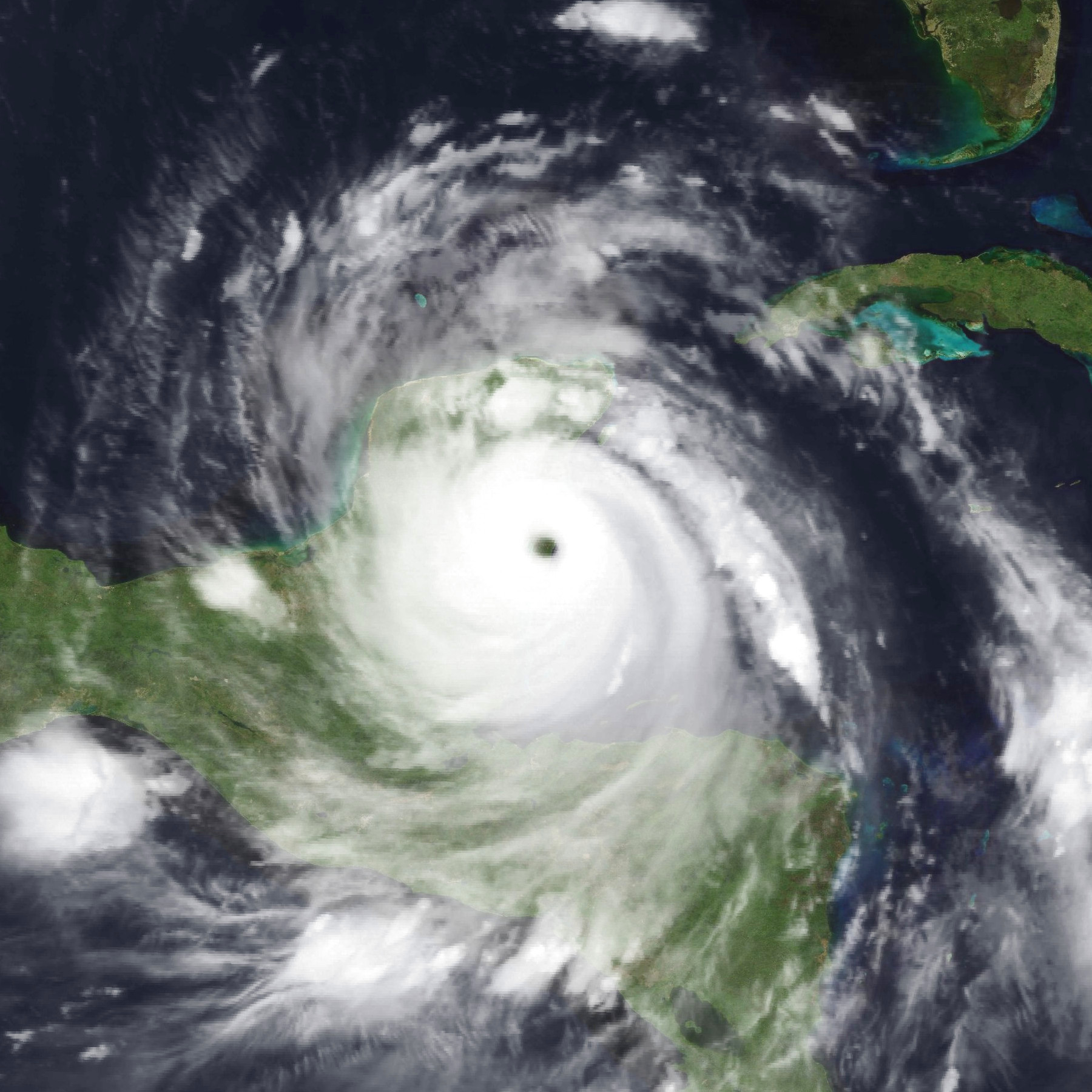
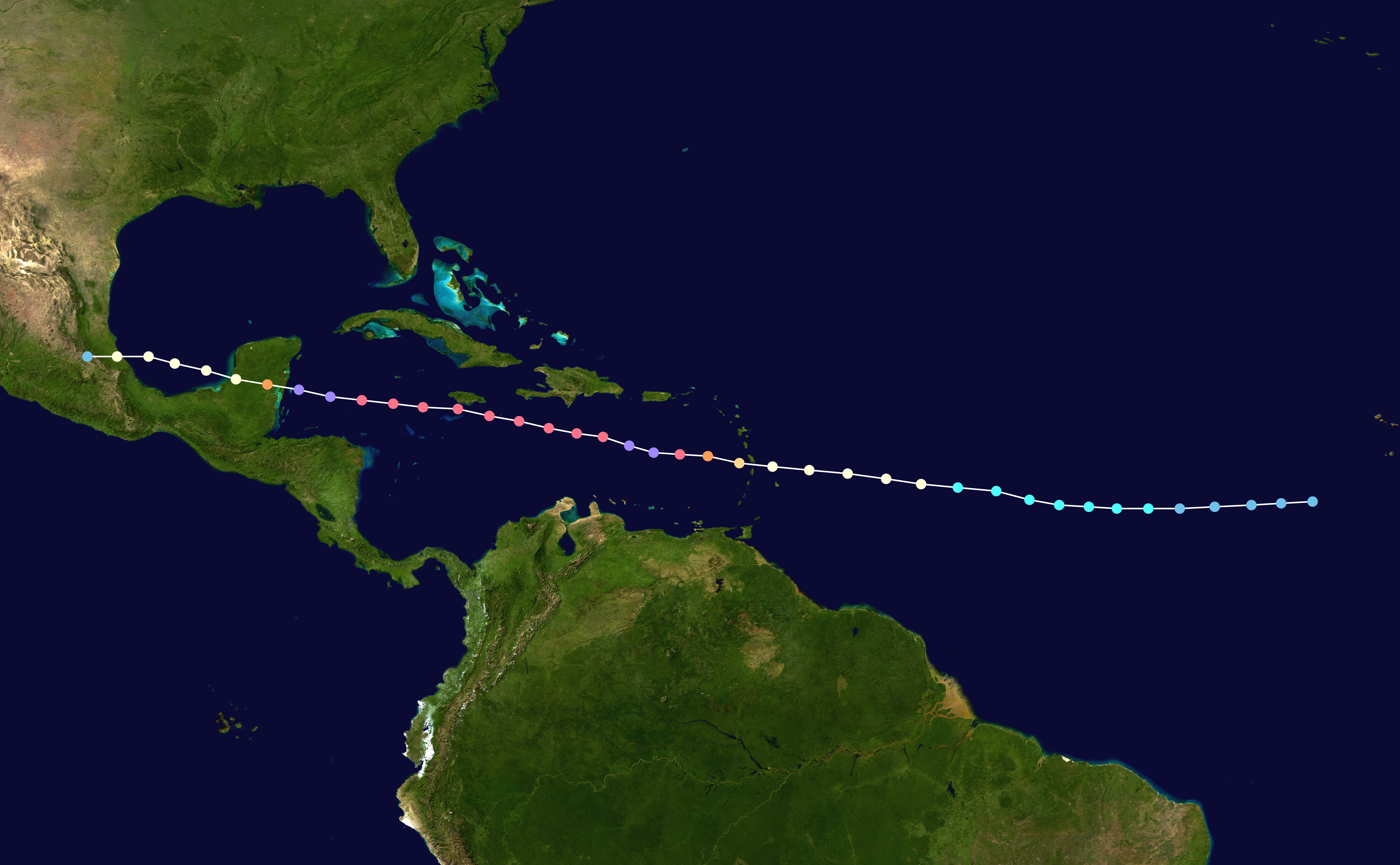
- Duration: August 13 – August 23
- Peak intensity: 175 mph (280 km/h) (1-min); 905 mbar (hPa)

On August 11, a tropical wave moved off the west coast of Africa, and, encountering favorable conditions, quickly spawned Tropical Depression Four, roughly 520 mi (835 km) west-southwest of Cabo Verde. The depression moved briskly westward, south of a deep layered ridge, and was upgraded to Tropical Storm Dean on August 14. The storm continued to strengthen overnight as it gained organization, and became the first hurricane of the season on August 16. Dean passed into the Caribbean on the following day between the islands of Martinique and Saint Lucia as a Category 2 hurricane. In the warm waters of the Caribbean, Dean rapidly strengthened into a Category 5 hurricane with 165 mph (265 km/h) sustained winds. An eyewall replacement cycle weakened Dean, which then passed just south of Jamaica as a Category 4 hurricane on August 19.

Dean regained Category 5 status late on August 20 and as it struck the Yucatán Peninsula of Mexico near Costa Maya on the following day, the storm peaked with winds of 175 mph (280 km/h) and a minimum pressure of 905 mbar (26.7 inHg), becoming the third most intense landfalling Atlantic storm in history, after Hurricane Gilbert in 1988, the Labor Day Hurricane of 1935, and Hurricane Melissa in 2025. Dean was also the first storm to make landfall as a Category 5 hurricane in the Atlantic basin since Hurricane Andrew in 1992. Dean weakened over land, but re-intensified slightly in the Gulf of Mexico. It made its final landfall near Tecolutla, Veracruz on August 22, as a Category 2 hurricane with winds of 100 mph (155 km/h), dissipating the next day.

In the Lesser Antilles, Dean killed three people on Martinique, two on Dominica, and one on St. Lucia. Martinique was particularly hard hit, where the storm severely damaged 7,500 homes and destroyed 1,300 others. The island also lost virtually all of its banana crops and about 70% of sugar cane. Flooding and mudslides occurred on Hispaniola, destroying hundreds of homes and killing 20 people, 14 in Haiti and 6 in the Dominican Republic. On Jamaica, Dean deroofed 1,500 structures and heavily damaged 3,127 homes, 1,582 of which were left uninhabitable. Extensive agriculture losses occurred, especially to banana, cocoa, and sugar cane crops, as well as coffee trees. The hurricane damaged at least 50,000 homes to varying degrees in Mexico, leaving roughly 15,000 families homeless. Tens of thousands or hundreds of thousands of acres of citrus, coffee, corn, and habaneros were lost. Over 100,000 people without electricity and numerous others lost access to potable water. Dean left at least 12 people died in Mexico. Throughout its path, the hurricane caused 45 deaths and about $1.76 billion in damage, with Mexico accounting for about $600 million of that total.

=== Tropical Storm Erin ===
- Tropical storm (SSHWS)
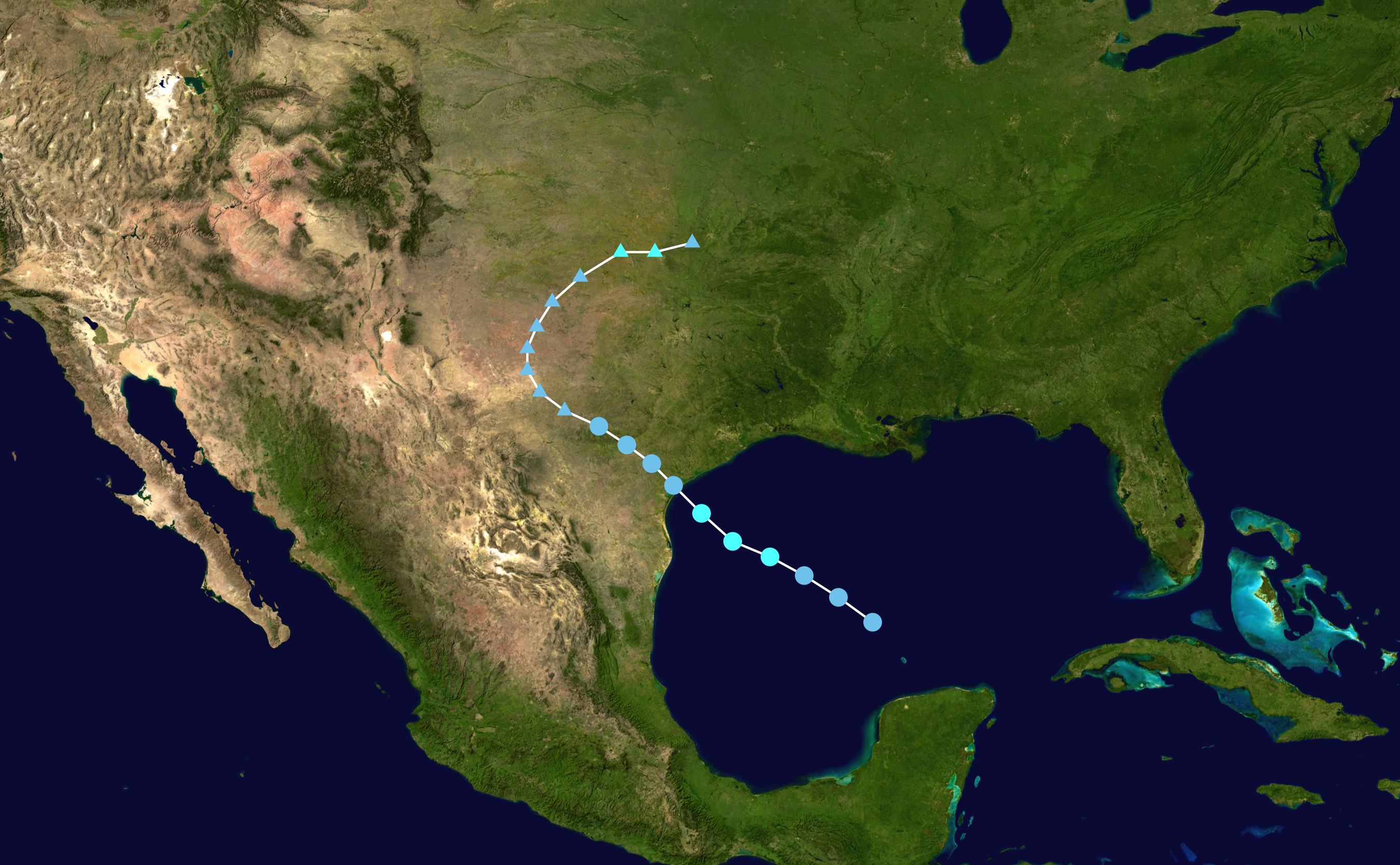
- Duration: August 15 – August 17
- Peak intensity: 40 mph (65 km/h) (1-min); 1003 mbar (hPa)

A tropical wave entered the Atlantic on August 3 and a surface low formed in association with the wave over the Caribbean on August 12. After reaching the Gulf of Mexico, decreasing wind shear allowed the system to develop into a tropical depression early on August 15 about 430 mi (690 km) east-southeast of Brownsville, Texas. The depression was upgraded to Tropical Storm Erin several hours later. Peaking with winds of 40 mph (65 km/h) and a minimum pressure of 1,003 mbar (29.6 inHg), Erin weakened to a tropical depression as it made landfall near Lamar, Texas, on August 16. Erin degenerated into a remnant low on the next day, but after entering Oklahoma early on August 19, the remnant low suddenly re-intensified to sustained winds of 60 mph (95 km/h) near Oklahoma City. The low dissipated that day, but the mid-level vortex continued generally eastward across the Eastern United States.

Heavy rains in the Greater Houston area caused flooding that damaged over 400 homes and 40 businesses. Farther inland, approximately 2,000 people evacuated from their homes in Abilene due to flood concerns. Throughout Texas, Erin killed nine people and inflicted over $48.8 million in damage. The remnants of Erin also brought heavy precipitation to parts of Oklahoma and Missouri, peaking at 12.81 in (325 mm) near Eakly in the former, while up to 11.94 in (303 mm) of rain fell in the latter at Miller, which remains the state record for a cyclone. Floods, tornadoes, and winds in Oklahoma caused about $5.88 million in damage to homes, trees, and power lines, while six people died. Parts of Missouri experienced similar effects, leading to one death and just over $21.95 million in damage.

=== Hurricane Felix ===
- Category 5 hurricane (SSHWS)
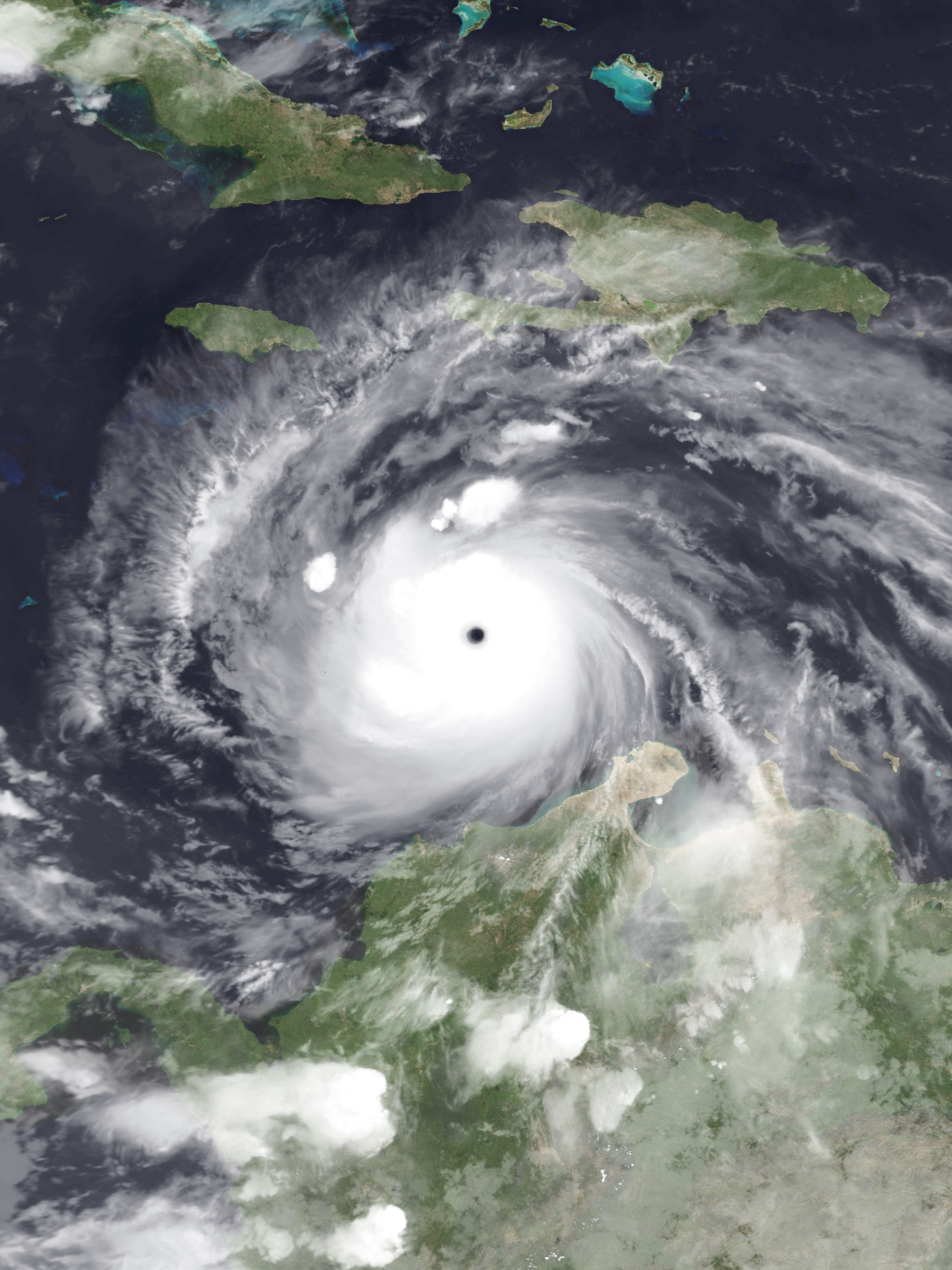
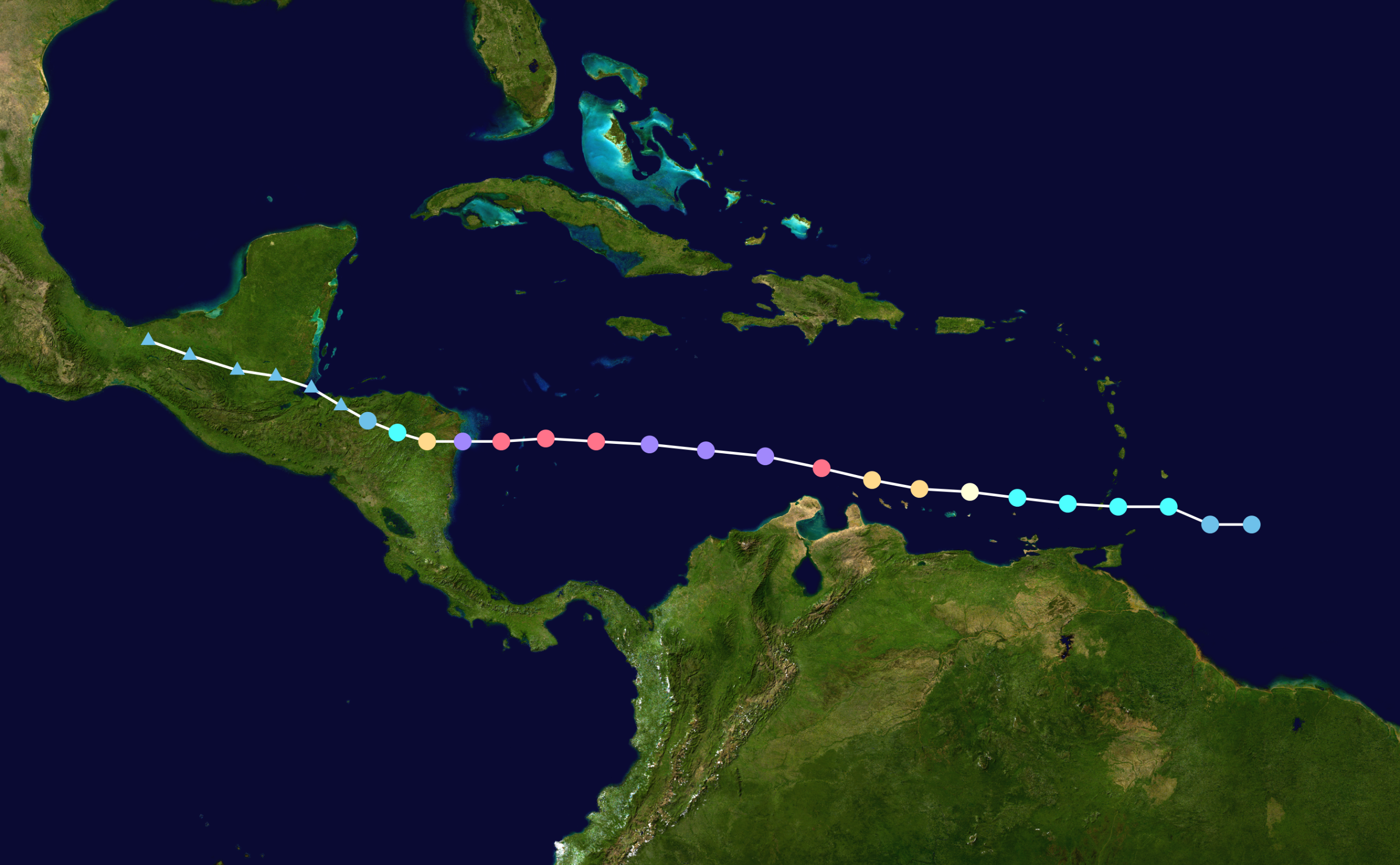
- Duration: August 31 – September 5
- Peak intensity: 175 mph (280 km/h) (1-min); 929 mbar (hPa)

On August 24, a tropical wave exited the west coast of Africa. After moving westward for about a week, the wave organized into a tropical depression on August 31 about 225 mi (360 km) east of Barbados. Early on September 1, the depression intensified into Tropical Storm Felix and crossed Grenada later that day. Felix upgraded to a hurricane on September 2. Tracking generally westward, it rapidly intensified to into a Category 5 hurricane on the following day and peaked with winds of 175 mph (280 km/h) and a minimum pressure of 929 mbar (27.4 inHg). After fluctuating in strength, Felix struck Nicaragua about 20 mi (30 km) north of Puerto Cabezas with 160 mph (260 km/h) winds on September 4. Thus, the 2007 season became the first known in the Atlantic to include two hurricanes making landfall at Category 5 intensity; hurricanes Irma and Maria accomplished this feat again in 2017. Felix quickly weakened as it moved inland and then into Honduras, degenerating into a remnant low over the Atlántida Department on September 5. The low continued west-northwestward until dissipating over eastern Mexico on the next day.

Felix took a similar path as Hurricane Dean though a bit farther south, although its effects were not severe; damage on Tobago was estimated at $250,000 (2007 TTD; $40,000 2007 USD$, 62,109 2026 USD). In Central America, residents were reported to have been given little warning of the oncoming hurricane, which left many fisherman stranded at sea. Only pillars remained of the homes standing on the Miskito Cays. On the mainland, Felix demolished approximately 9,000 homes, most in Puerto Cabezas, where about 90% of structures suffered some degree of damage. In all, Felix killed at least 130 people and caused about 13.4 billion (2007 NIO; $716.3 million 2007 USD$, 1.11 billion 2026 USD) in damage. Flooding occurred over Honduras, particularly around Tegucigalpa and areas near the Chamelecón and Ulúa rivers. The Comisión Permanente de Contingencias reported damaged to or the destruction of 215 homes, 73 roads, 7 schools, and 5 bridges. At least three people died in the country and crop damage alone totaled about L68.28 million (2007 HNL; $3.64 million 2007 USD$, 5.65 million 2026 USD).

=== Tropical Storm Gabrielle ===
- Tropical storm (SSHWS)
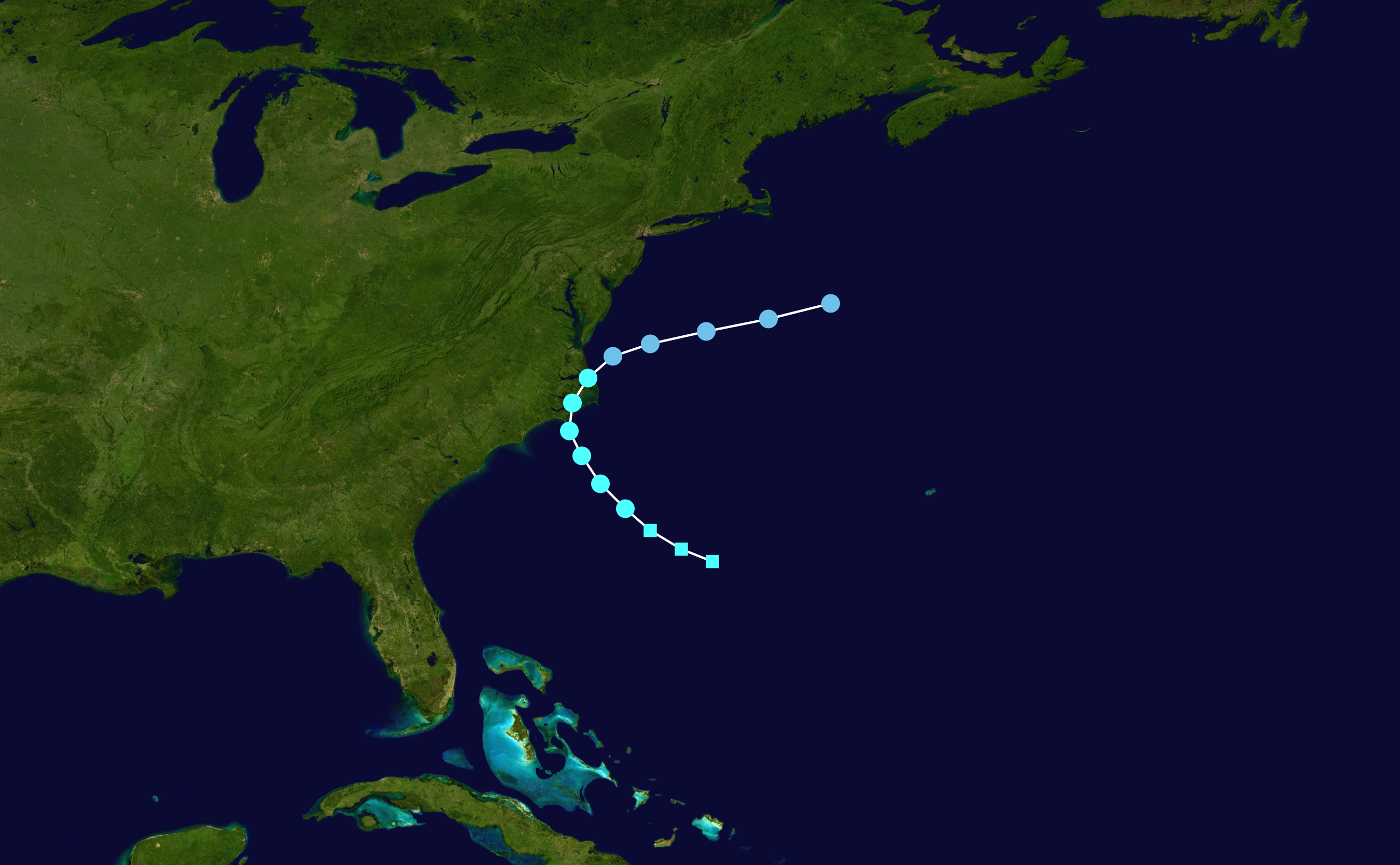
- Duration: September 8 – September 11
- Peak intensity: 60 mph (95 km/h) (1-min); 1004 mbar (hPa)

In early September, a cold front moved off the southeastern coast of the United States and developed a weak low over the waters near Georgia. The low drifted eastward and weakened over the next few days until it joined with convection from an upper-level trough over the western Atlantic. On September 8, the center of circulation organized into Subtropical Storm Gabrielle, about 414 mi (665 km) southeast of Cape Hatteras. For the next 12 hours, Gabrielle's strongest winds and thunderstorms remained separated from the center, but new convection eventually united with the center, signaling a transition into a tropical storm. Gabrielle gradually strengthened as it traveled northwest towards North Carolina and Virginia. The storm reached its peak intensity of 60 mph (95 km/h) and a minimum pressure of 1,004 mbar (29.6 inHg) just before striking Cape Lookout, though strong wind shear kept most of the convection and surface winds offshore. Gabrielle weakened over land, and moved back into the Atlantic on September 10. The circulation deteriorated further, and the storm dissipated about 345 mi (555 km) southwest of Nova Scotia the next day.

In advance of the storm, tropical cyclone watches and warnings were issued for coastal areas, while rescue teams and the United States Coast Guard were put on standby. The storm dropped heavy rainfall in North Carolina near its immediate landfall location, peaking at 9.03 in (229 mm) in Carteret County, but little precipitation elsewhere. Along the coast, high waves, rip currents, and storm surge were reported. Slight localized flooding was reported, particularly in North Carolina at Beaufort and Morehead City, closing some roads and causing minor damage to several homes and businesses, totaling about $5,000. Gusty winds also occurred, with tropical storm-force sustained winds and gusts at a few locations along the Outer Banks. One person drowned in Florida.

=== Tropical Storm Ingrid ===
- Tropical storm (SSHWS)
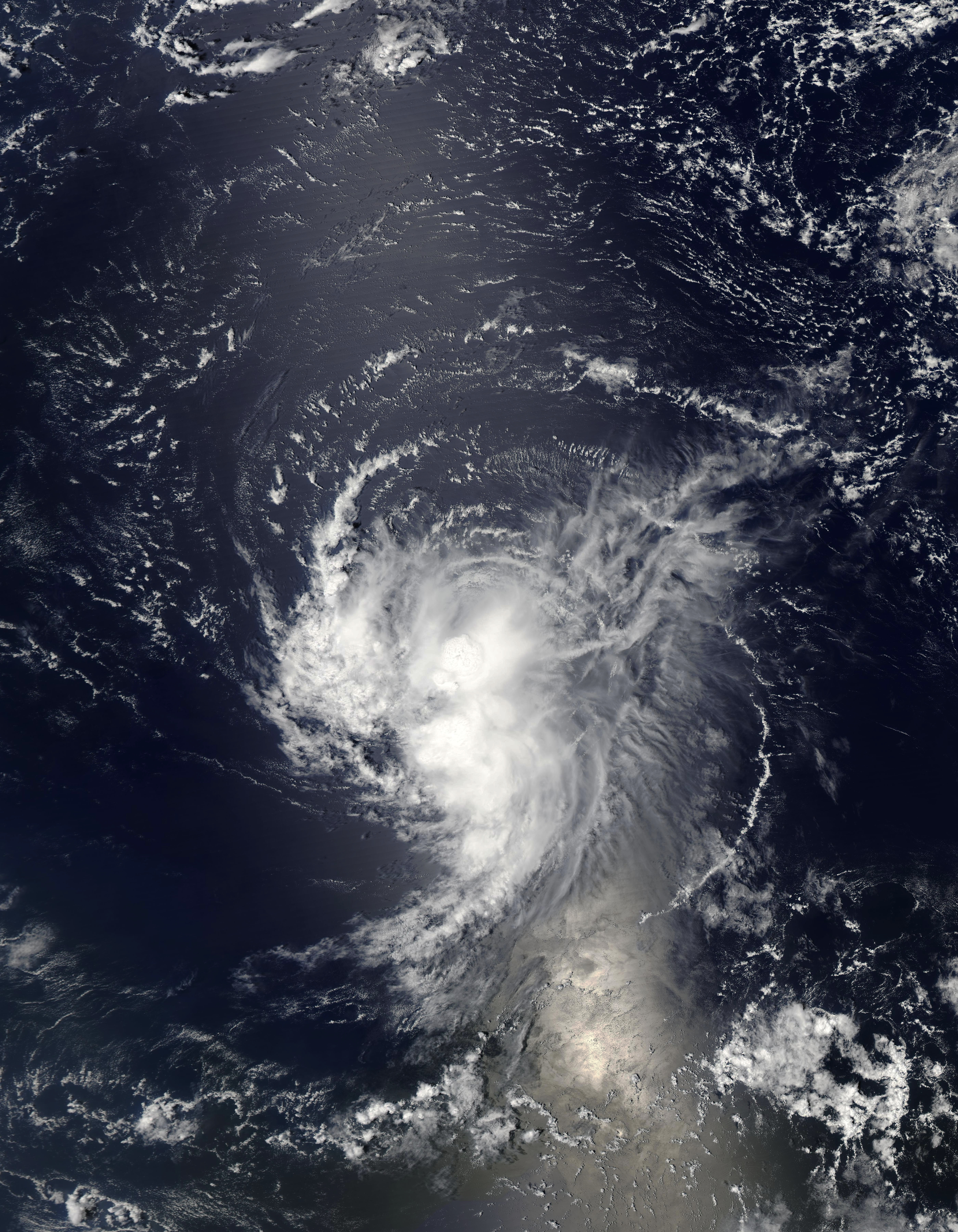
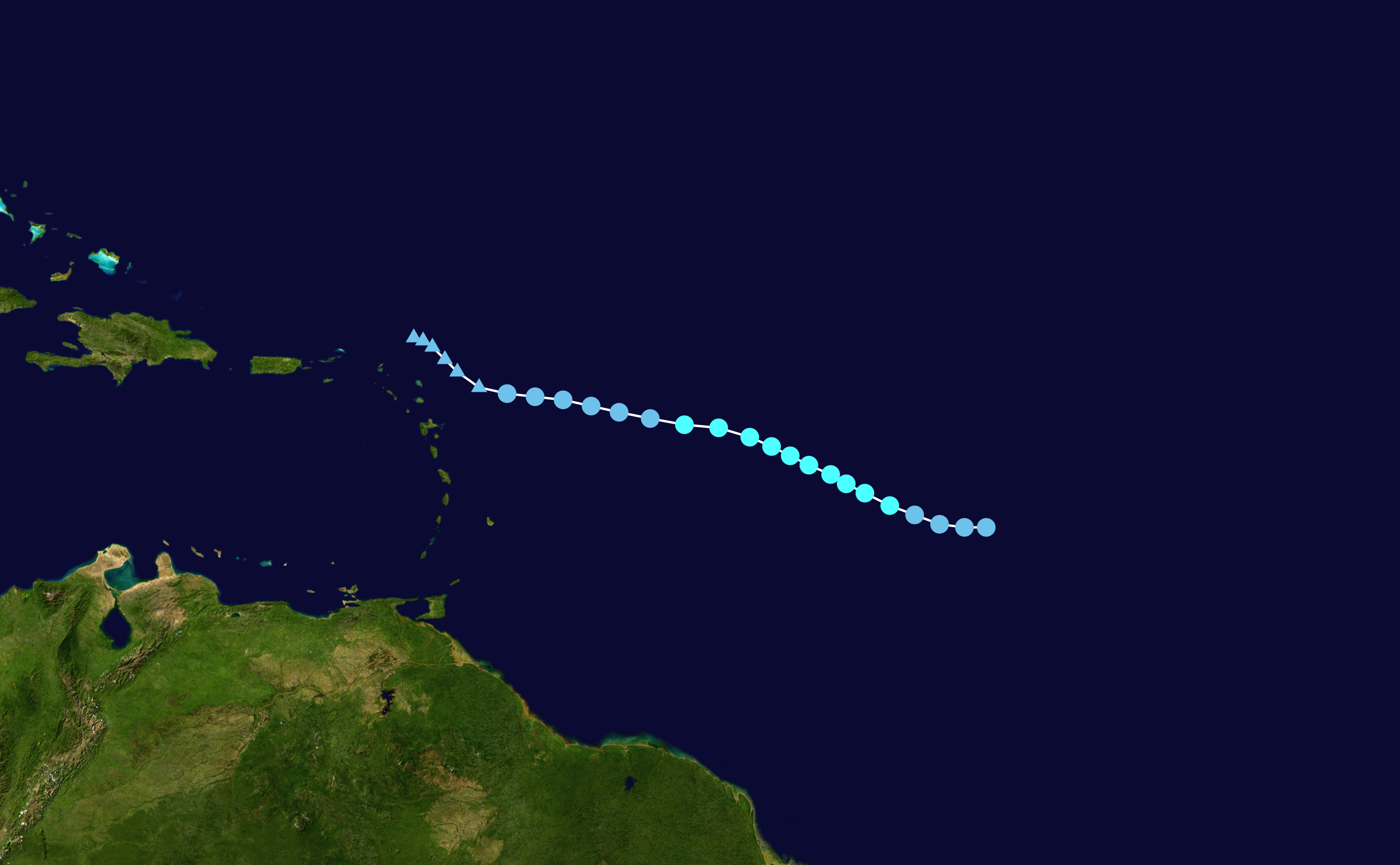
- Duration: September 12 – September 17
- Peak intensity: 45 mph (75 km/h) (1-min); 1002 mbar (hPa)

A large tropical wave exited Africa on September 6 and initially failed to develop due to strong easterly shear. On September 9, a broad low-pressure area developed about midway between Africa and the Lesser Antilles. The wind shear slowly weakened, and early on September 12 Tropical Depression Eight developed about 1,125 mi (1,810 km) east of the Lesser Antilles. The system moved west-northwestward due to a ridge to its north, and with continued wind shear, it remained a tropical depression for 24 hours before convection increased further. Early on September 13 it intensified into Tropical Storm Ingrid, peaking with winds of 45 mph (75 km/h) and a minimum pressure of 1,002 mbar (29.6 inHg). Operationally, it was not upgraded to a tropical storm until that evening. Ingrid weakened to a tropical depression on September 15 due to high shear from a strong tropical upper tropospheric trough. Although Ingrid briefly reorganized on September 16, the cyclone weakened further and degenerated into a remnant low early on September 17 about 160 mi (255 km) east-northeast of Antigua. The remnants turned northwestward within the low-level steering flow, and dissipated on September 18.

=== Hurricane Humberto ===
- Category 1 hurricane (SSHWS)
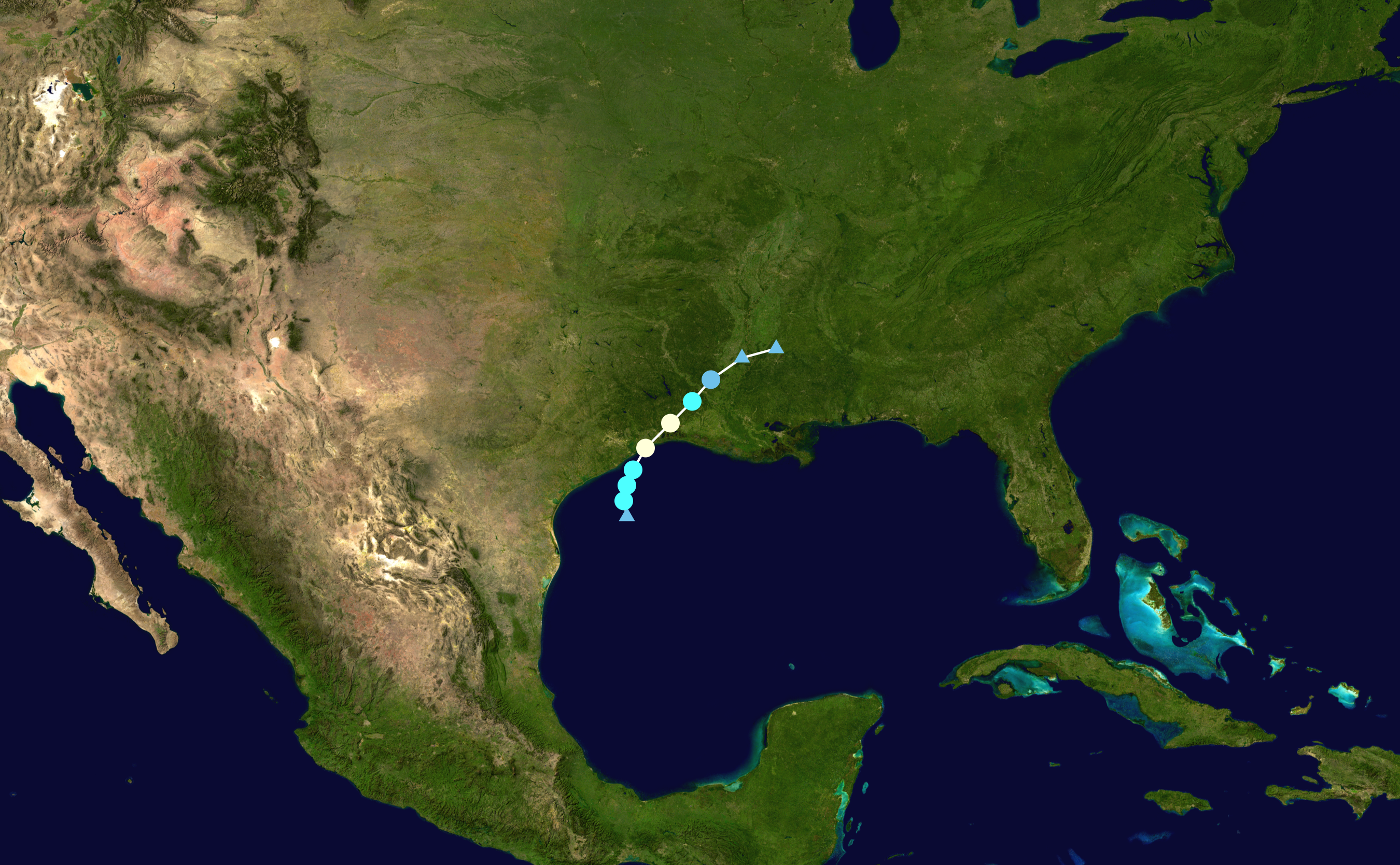
- Duration: September 12 – September 14
- Peak intensity: 90 mph (150 km/h) (1-min); 985 mbar (hPa)

The remnants of a frontal trough entered the southeastern Gulf of Mexico on September 5. After nearly a week, a surface low developed, which organized into Tropical Depression Nine on September 12 about 60 mi (95 km) southeast of Matagorda, Texas. Within three hours of forming, it strengthened into Tropical Storm Humberto while turning north-northeastward. In the early morning hours of September 13, a Hurricane Hunter aircraft found that Humberto had rapidly intensified into a hurricane while located about 15 mi (25 km) offshore Texas. Early on September 13, the storm peaked with winds of 90 mph (150 km/h) and a minimum pressure of 985 mbar (29.1 inHg), one hour before making landfall near High Island. Humberto quickly weakened and entered Southwest Louisiana as a tropical storm later on September 13, dissipating the next day.

In Texas, Humberto caused some structural damage on High Island and widespread tree and power line damage in the Beaumont–Port Arthur area. Power outages caused four oil refineries to halt production in Beaumont, while nearly 120,000 dwellings lost electricity in the state. One person was reported dead as a result of the storm, a Bridge City man killed when his carport crashed on him outside his house. The Federal Emergency Management Agency reported that Humberto destroyed 25 homes, severely damaged 96 residences, and caused minor damage to 240 others. Humberto and its remnants brought flooding and several tornadoes to other parts of the Southern United States. Damage was estimated at $50 million, mostly in Texas.

=== Tropical Depression Ten ===
- Tropical depression (SSHWS)
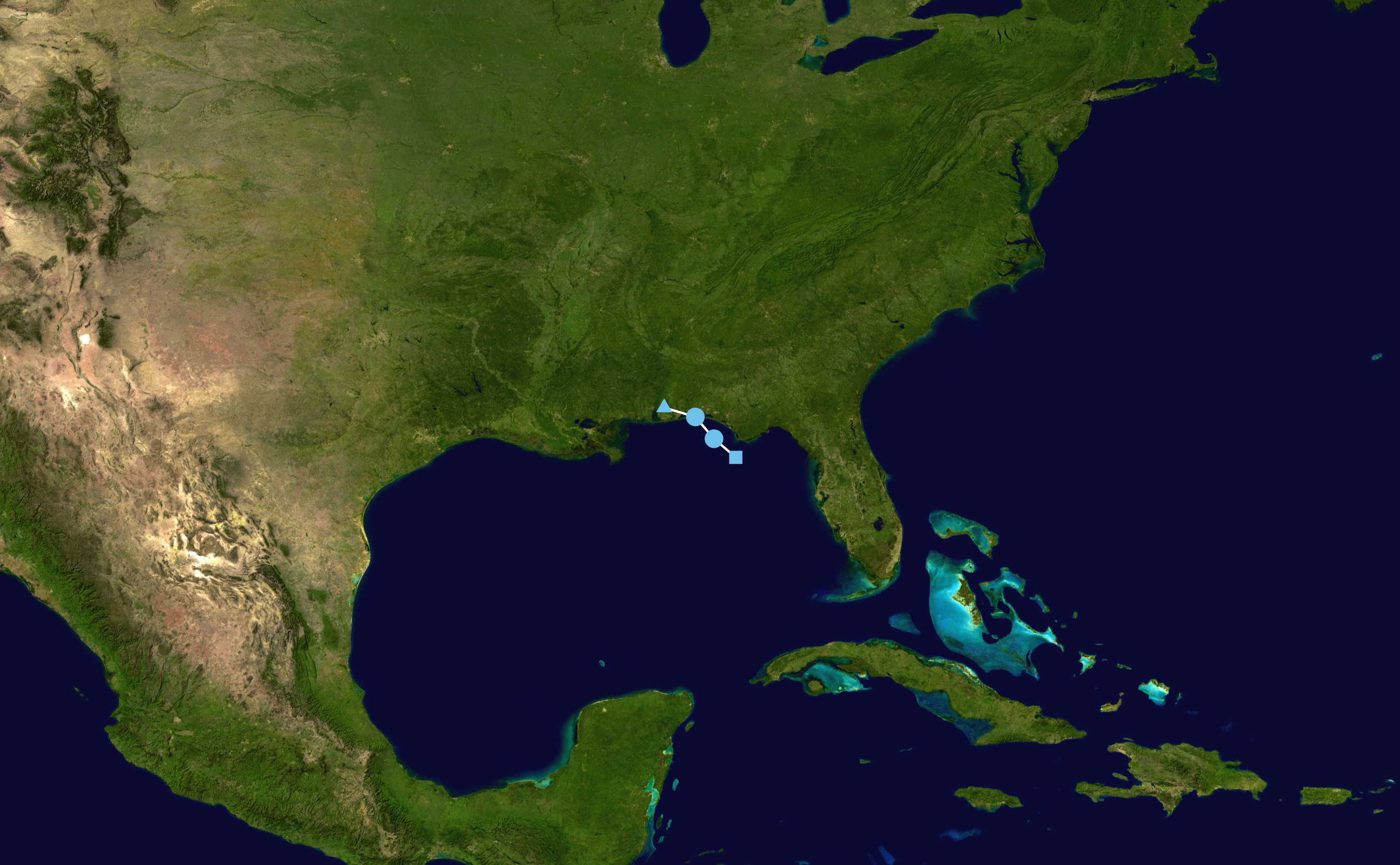
- Duration: September 21 – September 22
- Peak intensity: 35 mph (55 km/h) (1-min); 1005 mbar (hPa)

A subtropical depression formed on September 21 in the northeastern Gulf of Mexico from the interaction of a tropical wave, the tail end of a cold front, and an upper-level low. Initially containing a poorly defined circulation and intermittent thunderstorm activity, the system soon transitioned into a tropical depression after convection increased over the center. Late on September 21, the cyclone peaked with winds of 35 mph (55 km/h) and a minimum pressure of 1,005 mbar (29.7 inHg). Tracking northwestward, the depression moved ashore near Fort Walton Beach, Florida, early on September 22, and shortly thereafter it dissipated over southeastern Alabama.

The precursor system spawned a damaging tornado in Eustis, Florida, where 20 houses were destroyed and 30 more were damaged. Damage from that tornado was estimated at $6.2 million. Additionally, a lightning strike from the depression's precursor killed a person in Hendry County. It was the first cyclone to threaten the New Orleans area after the destructive 2005 hurricane season and Hurricane Katrina. However, overall impact from the cyclone itself was minor and largely limited to light rainfall.

=== Tropical Storm Jerry ===
- Tropical storm (SSHWS)
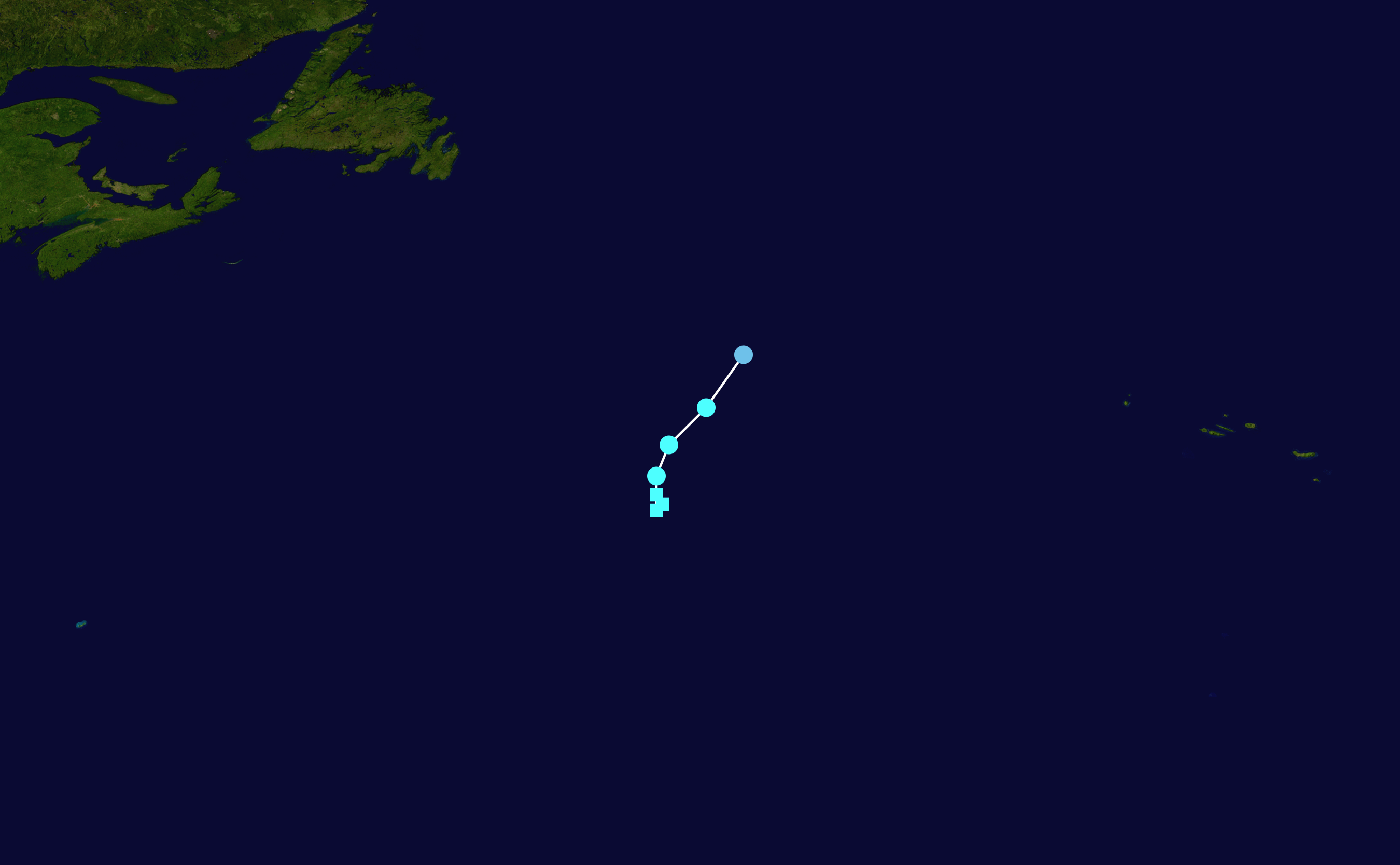
- Duration: September 23 – September 24
- Peak intensity: 40 mph (65 km/h) (1-min); 1003 mbar (hPa)

The origins of Jerry were from a non-tropical low-pressure area over the central Atlantic on September 21. The system meandered for two days, gradually developing deeper convection and gaining organization. On September 23, the National Hurricane Center declared it a subtropical depression about 800 mi (1,285 km) southeast of Cape Race, Newfoundland, as a warm core had developed but the system was still involved with an upper-level low, and its strongest winds were well removed from the center. Early on September 23, both satellite estimates and QuikScat data determined that the depression had strengthened into Subtropical Storm Jerry, despite the lack of a well-defined inner core.

The storm slowly acquired tropical characteristics including a better-defined warm core, and Jerry became fully tropical that evening as a weak and sheared tropical storm with 40 mph (65 km/h) winds over a small radius, as well as a minimum pressure of 1,003 mbar (29.6 inHg) Jerry accelerated northeastward over cooler waters with sea surface temperatures below 75 °F (24 °C). On September 24, it weakened to a tropical depression ahead of a powerful cold front with little deep convection remaining in the system. That evening, a QuikScat pass determined that Jerry opened up into a trough, which was being absorbed into the larger frontal system, while located about 620 mi (1,000 km) east-southeast of Cape Race, Newfoundland. It completely dissipated by early on September 25.

=== Hurricane Karen ===
- Category 1 hurricane (SSHWS)
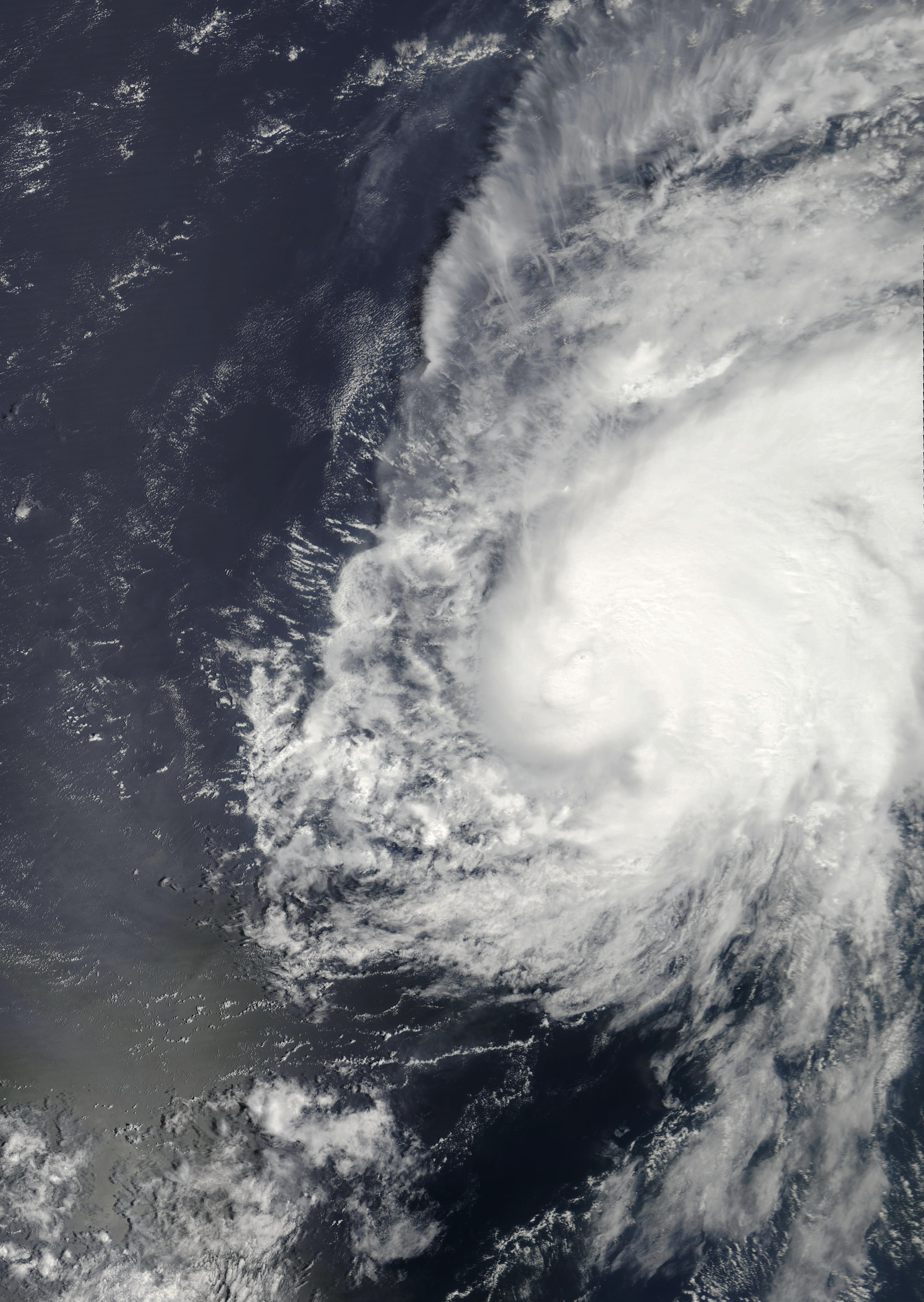
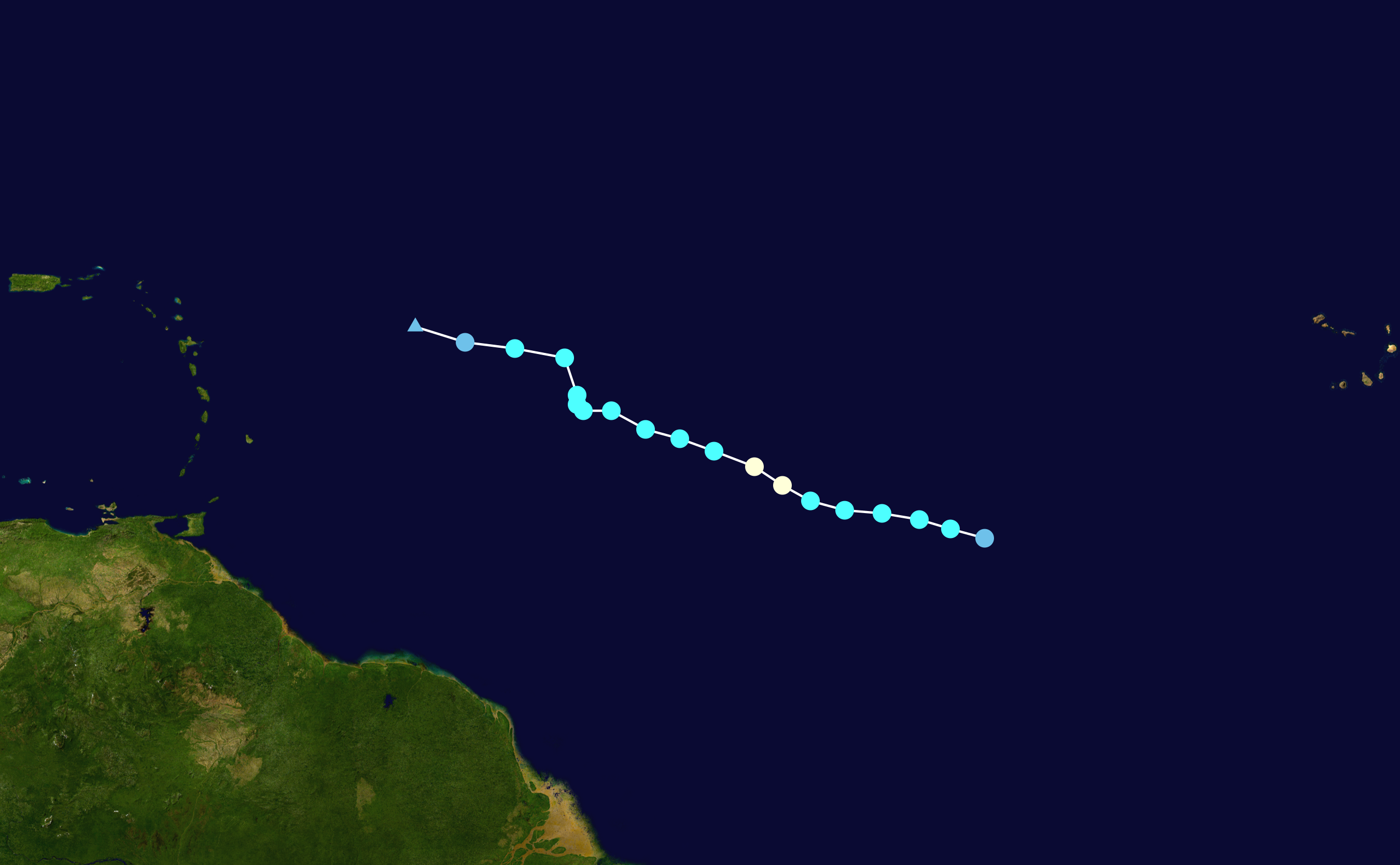
- Duration: September 25 – September 29
- Peak intensity: 75 mph (120 km/h) (1-min); 988 mbar (hPa)

A very large tropical wave accompanied by a large envelope of low pressure emerged from the coast of Africa on September 21. As it moved westward, deep convection gradually increased over the disturbance as its broad low-level circulation became better-defined. By September 24, as the system traveled northwestward it organized enough to become a tropical depression. Six hours later the depression was upgraded to Tropical Storm Karen. Karen's organization and intensity remained steady for the next day. Early on September 26, however, the storm strengthened significantly. In post-operational analysis, the cyclone was determined to have reached hurricane-strength for about twelve hours, peaking with winds of 75 mph (120 km/h) and a minimum pressure of 998 mbar (29.5 inHg).

A sharp upper-level trough to the west of Karen increased the amount of vertical wind shear over the hurricane. By September 28, these unfavorable conditions had weakened Karen to a marginal tropical storm and left its large low-level circulation exposed. Meanwhile, the storm began heading northward and experiencing intermittent bursts of deep convection. However, the relentless wind shear exposed the system's circulation until it degenerated into a remnant low about 460 mi (740 km) east of the Leeward Islands on September 29. Karen's remnants lingered near the Leeward Islands for the next few days.

=== Hurricane Lorenzo ===
- Category 1 hurricane (SSHWS)
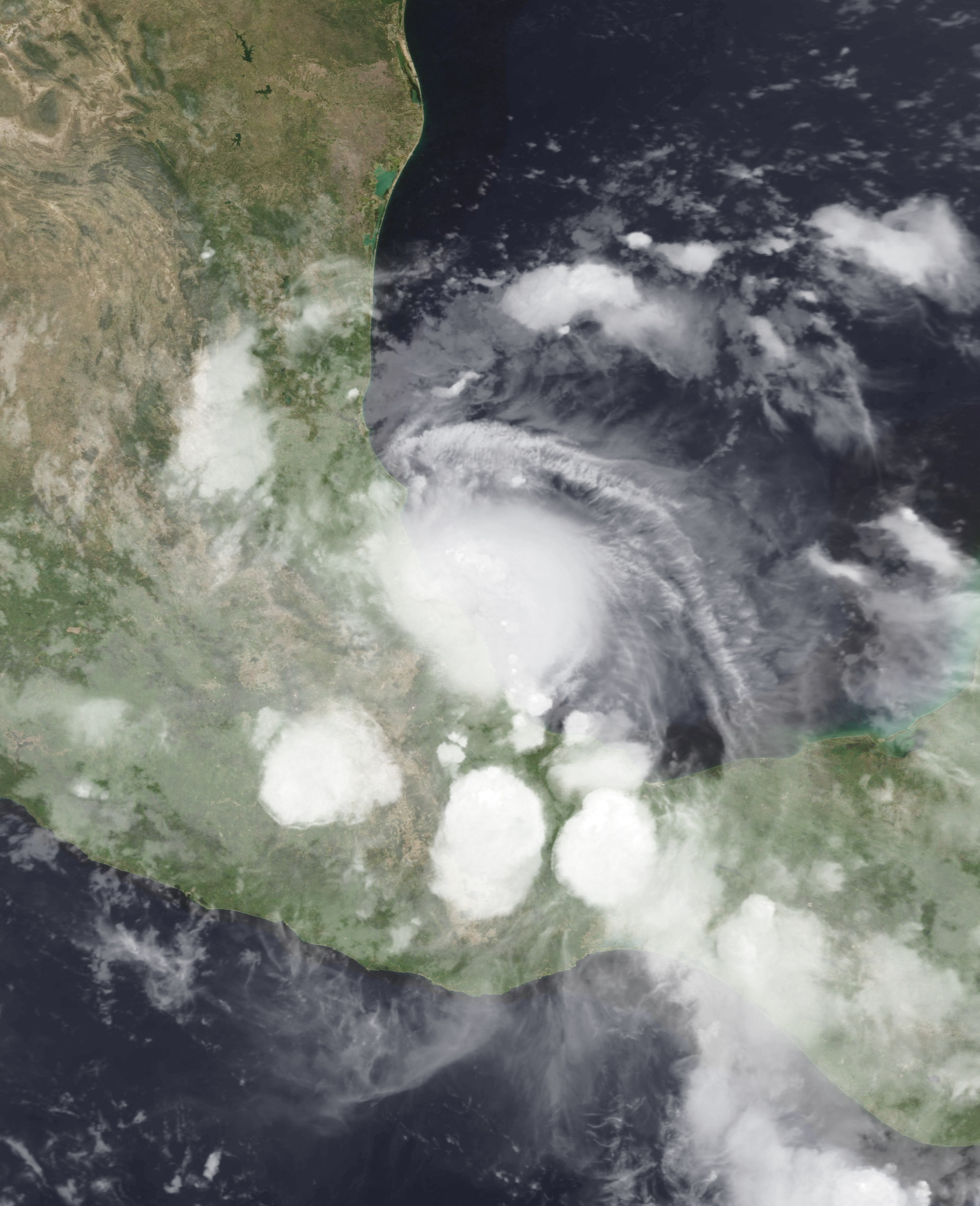
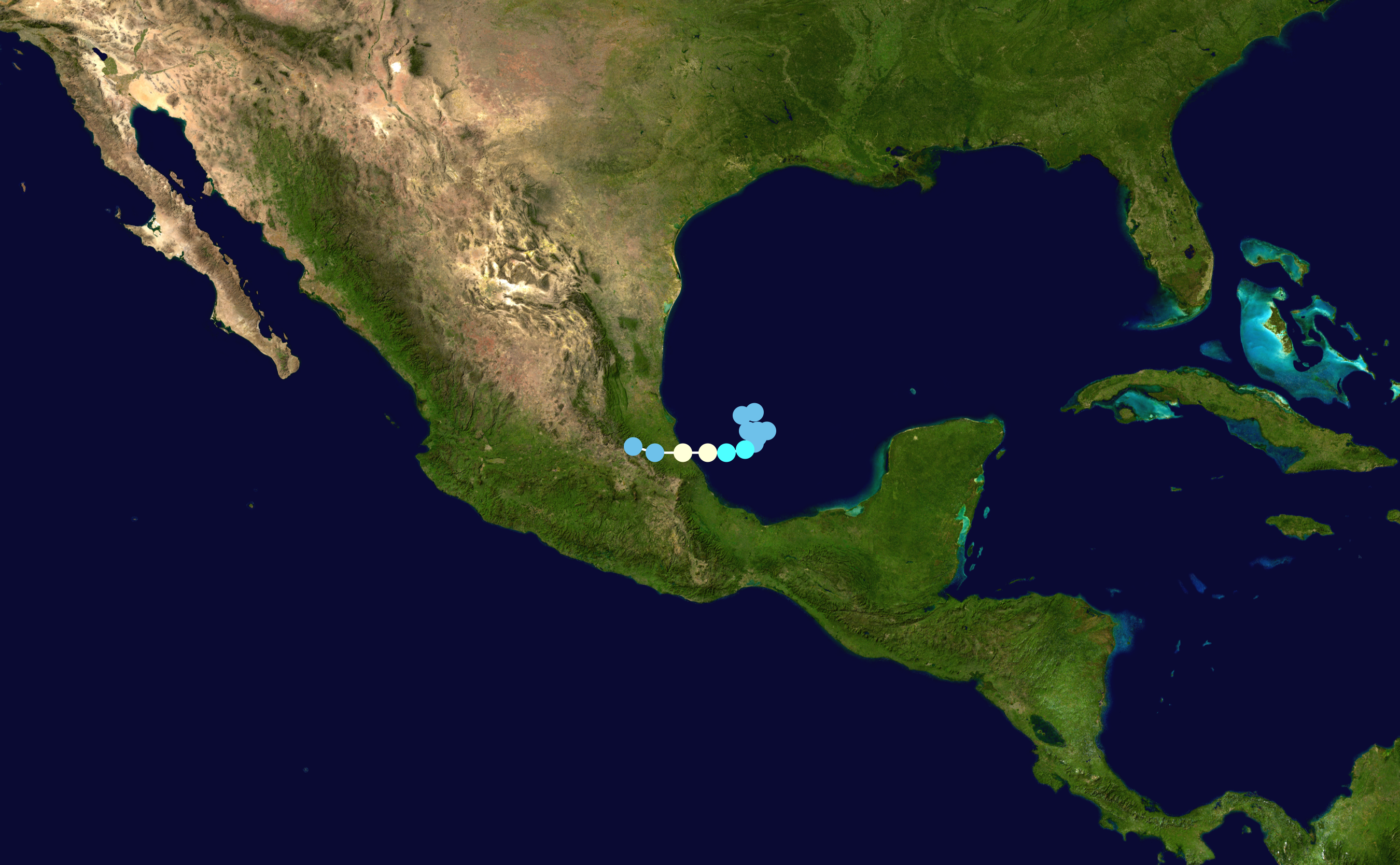
- Duration: September 25 – September 28
- Peak intensity: 80 mph (130 km/h) (1-min); 990 mbar (hPa)

A tropical wave moved off the western coast of Africa on September 11. After traversing the Caribbean and crossed the Yucatán Peninsula, the disturbance developed a small surface low on September 24 over the southwestern Gulf of Mexico. Strong upper-level winds initially prevented the system from developing convection; however, the shear relaxed on the following day and convection increased. Based on hurricane hunter aircraft observations, a tropical depression developed late on September 25 about 175 mi (280 km) east-northeast of Tuxpan. Under weak steering currents, the depression drifted south and southwest, executing a small cyclonic loop into the Bay of Campeche. Upper-level winds gave way to an anticyclone above the depression, and the system became Tropical Storm Lorenzo on September 27. The storm rapidly intensified to a hurricane less than 12 hours later. Lorenzo peaked on September 28 with winds of 80 mph (130 km/h) and a minimum pressure of 990 mbar (29 inHg), but weakened slightly before striking near Tecolutla, Veracruz. The small circulation then weakened rapidly and dissipated the next day.

Lorenzo made landfall in virtually the same location of Mexico that Hurricane Dean had struck a month earlier. Six deaths in Mexico were attributed to Lorenzo, mostly due to flash floods and mudslides. The states of Puebla and Veracruz reported damage from rain and high winds, with 169 homes damaged in the former. About 200 people were forced to evacuate in Hidalgo when the San Lorenzo River overflowed its banks, while another 25,000 people fled their homes in Veracruz as waterways swelled. Along the Cazones River in the former, floodwaters damaged over 1,000 dwellings. Approximately 85,000 lost electricity in the state after strong winds downed power lines. Overall, damage was estimated at $1 billion (2007 MXN; $92 million 2007 USD$, 143 million 2026 USD). In Texas, a remnant surface trough from Lorenzo fueled severe thunderstorms throughout the state. Damage in the region totaled to US$255,000.

=== Tropical Storm Melissa ===
- Tropical storm (SSHWS)
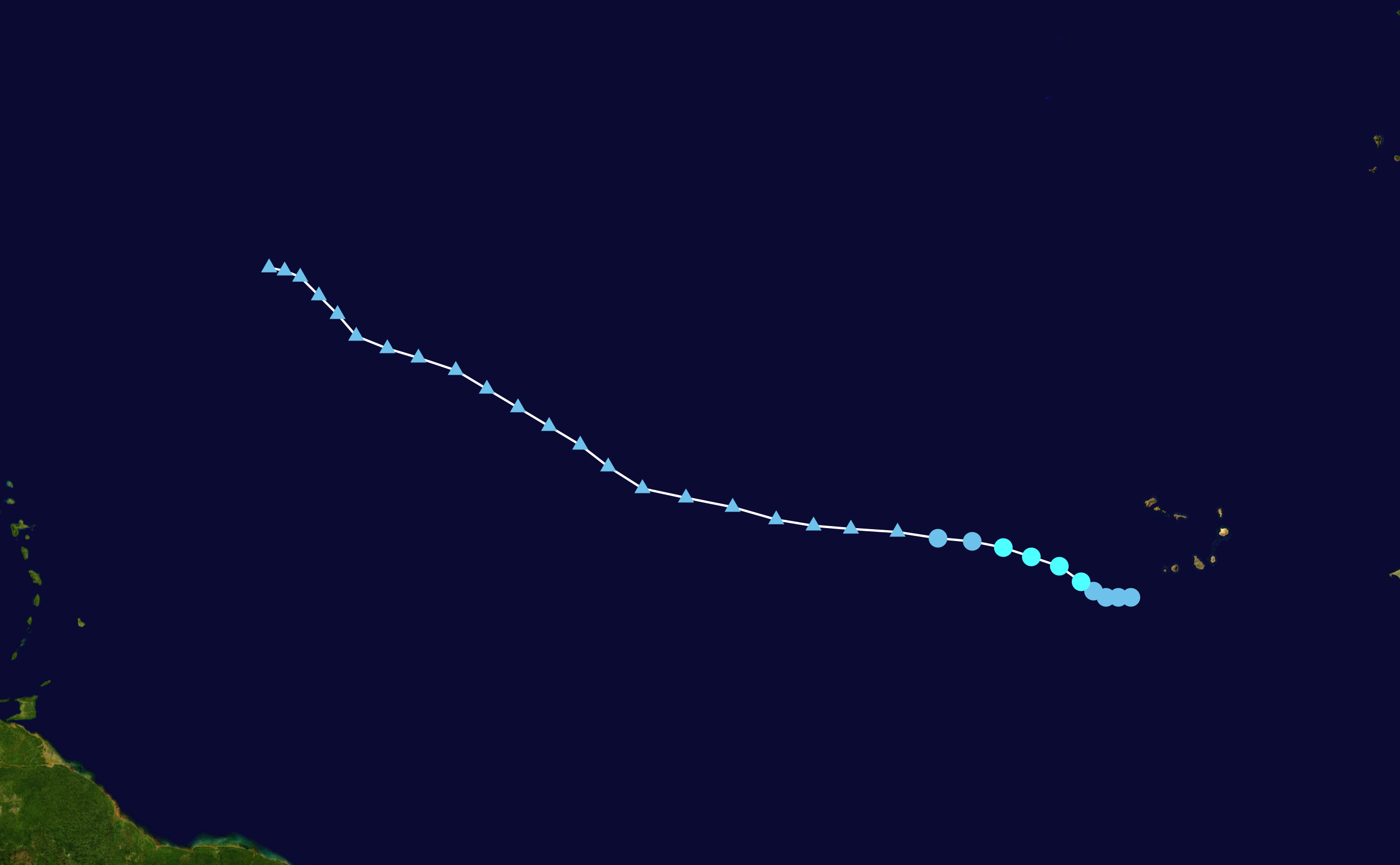
- Duration: September 28 – September 30
- Peak intensity: 40 mph (65 km/h) (1-min); 1005 mbar (hPa)

On September 26, a tropical wave exited Africa and quickly developed a low-pressure area. Following a convective increase and better-defined outflow, it developed into Tropical Depression Fourteen about 115 mi (185 km) west-southwest of the southernmost Cabo Verde Islands early on September 28. Because the depression was isolated from the subtropical ridge, the depression drifted west-northwestward. Westerly wind shear prevented significant development, but following an increase in convection, the depression intensified into Tropical Storm Melissa early on September 29. Similar to previous storms Ingrid and Karen, high wind shear in the deep tropics hindered Melissa's development. Melissa peaked with winds of 40 mph (65 km/h) and a minimum pressure of 1,005 mbar (29.7 inHg), although satellite imagery operationally suggested the storm reached 45 mph (75 km/h). By September 30, the shear and cooler waters weakened Melissa to a tropical depression with a poorly defined surface center. The system lost its deep convection and by that afternoon, Melissa degenerated into a remnant low about 530 mi (855 km) west-southwest of the Cabo Verde Islands. It continued west-northwestward, producing intermittent convection, until being absorbed by a front northeast of the Lesser Antilles on October 5.

=== Tropical Depression Fifteen ===
- Tropical depression (SSHWS)
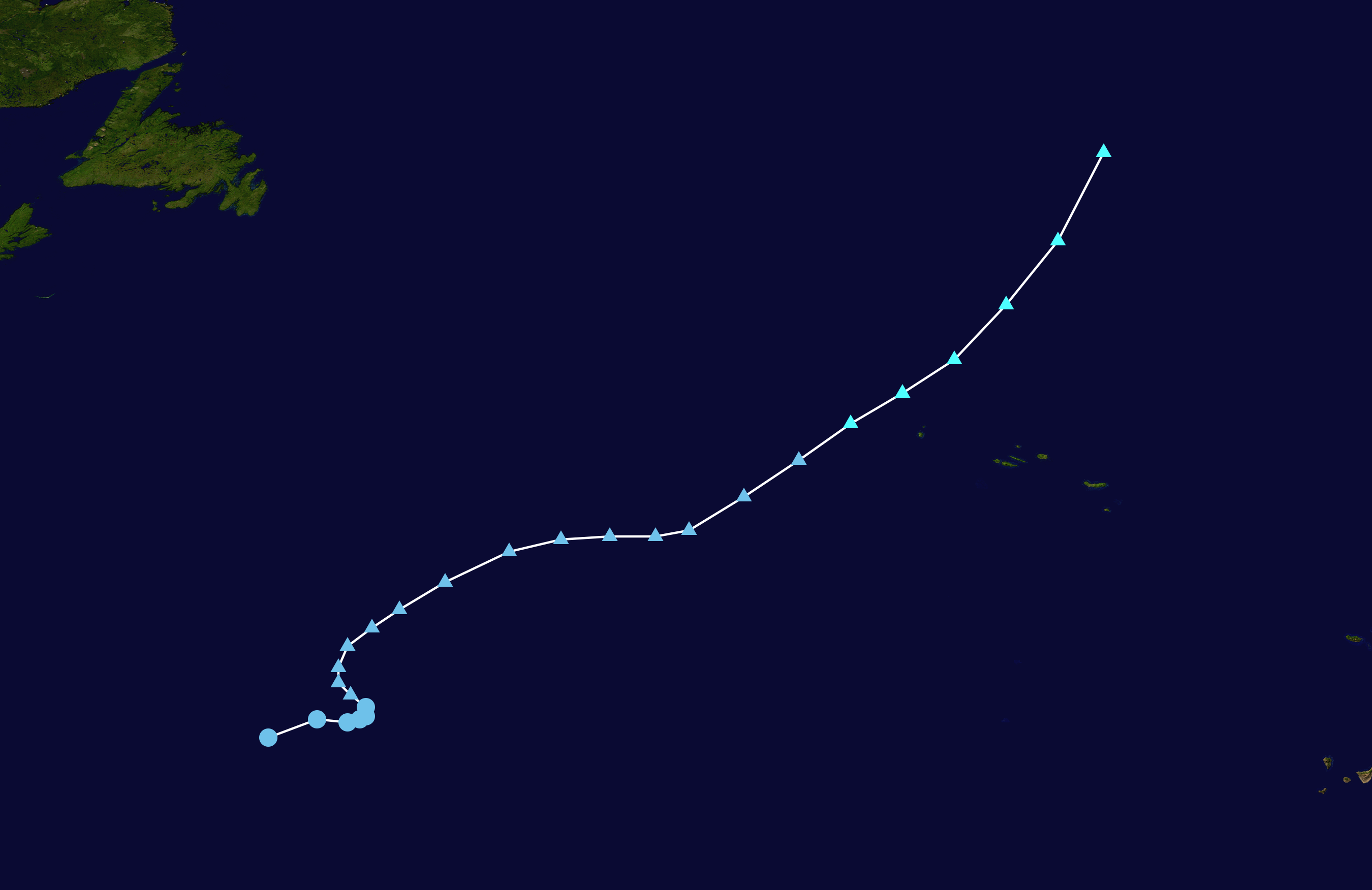
- Duration: October 11 – October 12
- Peak intensity: 35 mph (55 km/h) (1-min); 1011 mbar (hPa)

An area of disturbed weather extended from the northwestern Caribbean to the western Atlantic Ocean on October 4, possibly related to the remnants of Hurricane Karen. The system slowly organized, developing a surface low pressure on October 8 to the northeast of the Turks and Caicos Islands. Convection associated with the storm steadily increased as the low moved towards the northeast. By October 11, the low organized into Tropical Depression Fifteen about 740 mi (1,190 km) east-southeast of Bermuda, after the convection had persisted for about 12 hours. An upper-level low to the west caused strong southwesterly wind shear, which inhibited development, with the depression peaking with winds of 35 mph (55 km/h) and a minimum pressure of 1,011 mbar (29.9 inHg).

On October 12, a building ridge caused the depression to slow at the same time as the convection began decreasing. The storm's center became exposed as the deep convection became limited to a few small cells north of the center. By that afternoon, the depression degenerated into a remnant low about 910 mi (1,465 km). The remnant low persisted for the next several days while picking up speed and taking a gradual turn towards the northeast. The low transitioned into an extratropical cyclone on October 14 and intensified, moving through the Azores with gale-force winds. It reached winds of 50 mph (80 km/h) before being absorbed by a larger extratropical storm on October 18.

=== Hurricane Noel ===
- Category 1 hurricane (SSHWS)
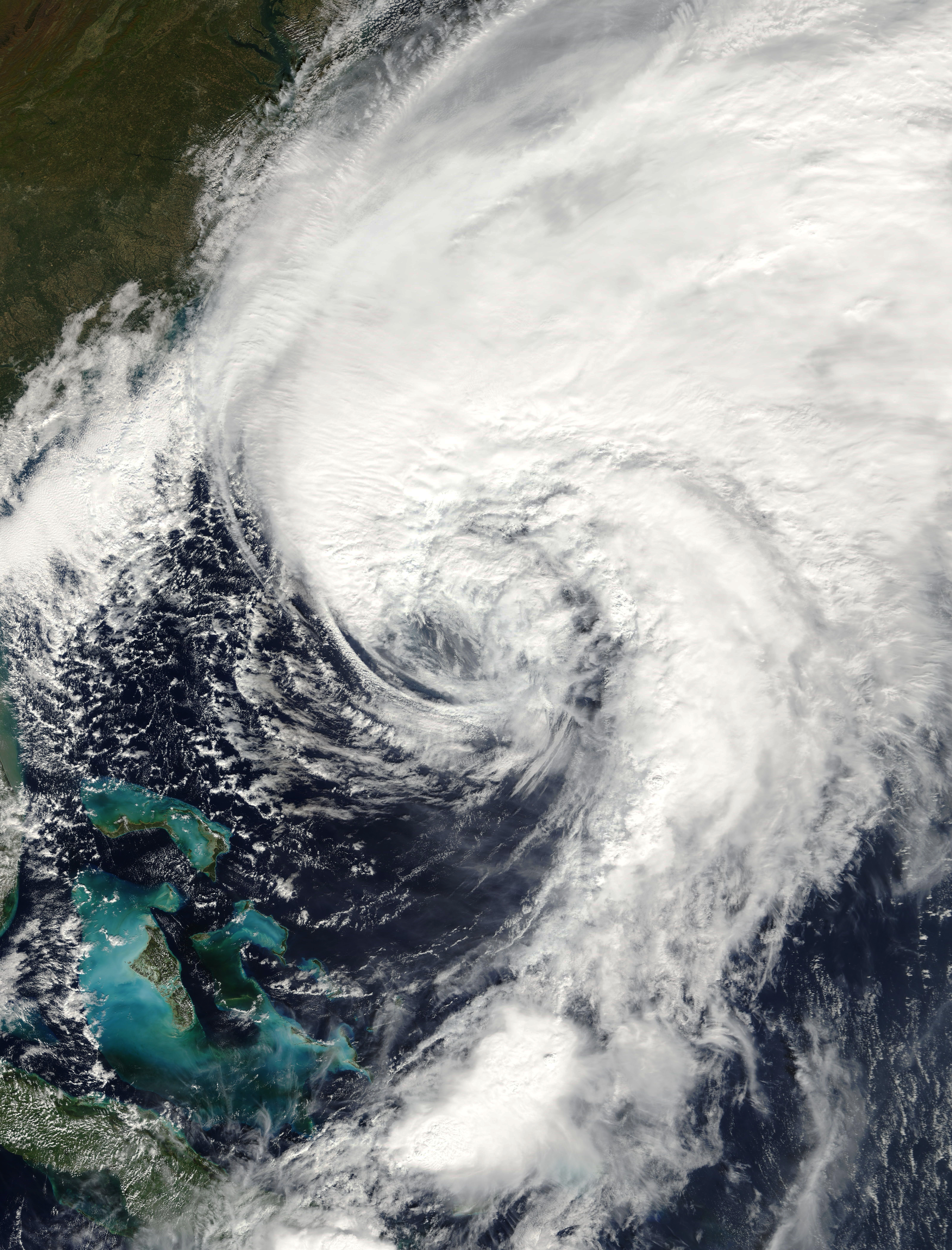
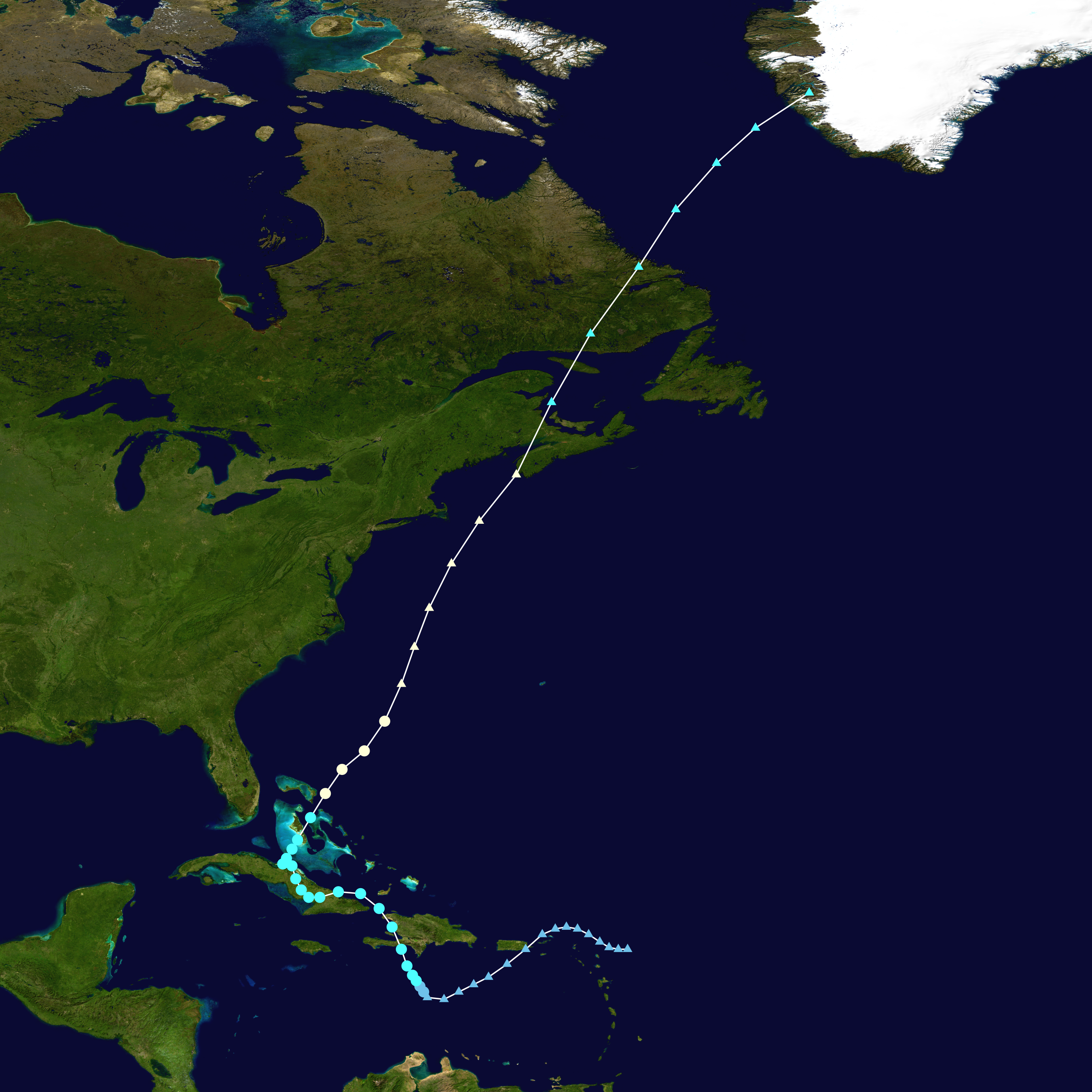
- Duration: October 28 – November 2
- Peak intensity: 80 mph (130 km/h) (1-min); 980 mbar (hPa)

Late on October 27, a low-pressure system that had been slowly developing over the eastern Caribbean organized into Tropical Depression Sixteen about 135 mi (215 km) south of Cabo Beata, Dominican Republic. On the next day, it strengthened into Tropical Storm Noel, and made landfall near Jacmel, Haiti, on October 29. Noel emerged over water but then made landfall near Guardalavaca, Holguín Province, on the following day. The storm entered the Atlantic near Cayo Romano on October 31 and turned northeastward, striking Andros and New Providence in the Bahamas on November 1. Noel intensified into a hurricane on the following day and peaked with winds of 80 mph (130 km/h) and a minimum pressure of 980 mbar (29 inHg), before being extratropical several hours later roughly 275 mi (445 km) southeast of Cape Hatteras, North Carolina. Tracking northward, Noel crossed Atlantic Canada as a powerful extratropical cyclone and emerged into the Labrador Sea prior to merging with another extratropical system on November 6 over Greenland.

In the Dominican Republic, flooding damaged more than 24,500 homes, about 6,000 of which were destroyed, leaving over 65,000 people homeless. A total of 46 bridges were in some way affected by Noel, isolating many communities. Noel caused at least 87 deaths in the country. The government of Haiti reported damage to almost 18,000 homes and the destruction of nearly 4,000 other, while crops suffered heavy losses. At least 73 people perished in Haiti. Similarly, most of the impact from Noel in Jamaica, Cuba, and the Bahamas was due to flooding, leading to one death each in those countries. The cyclone damaged or destroyed about 22,000 homes, 8,000 mi (13,000 km) of roads, and almost 125,000 acres (51,000 ha) of sugar cane in Cuba, with damaging totaling around $500 million. In the Bahamas, water entered several structures on Cat Island, Exuma, and Long Island. The East Coast of the United States experienced beach erosion, some power outage, and damage to several structures. Noel's remnants generated winds of 130 mph (210 km/h) in the Wreckhouse region of Newfoundland and Labrador, leaving about 190,000 people without power. A fish farm in Nova Scotia alone suffered about $1 million. One person drowned after a boat capsized. Throughout its path, Noel caused at least $580 million in damage.

=== Tropical Storm Olga ===
- Tropical storm (SSHWS)
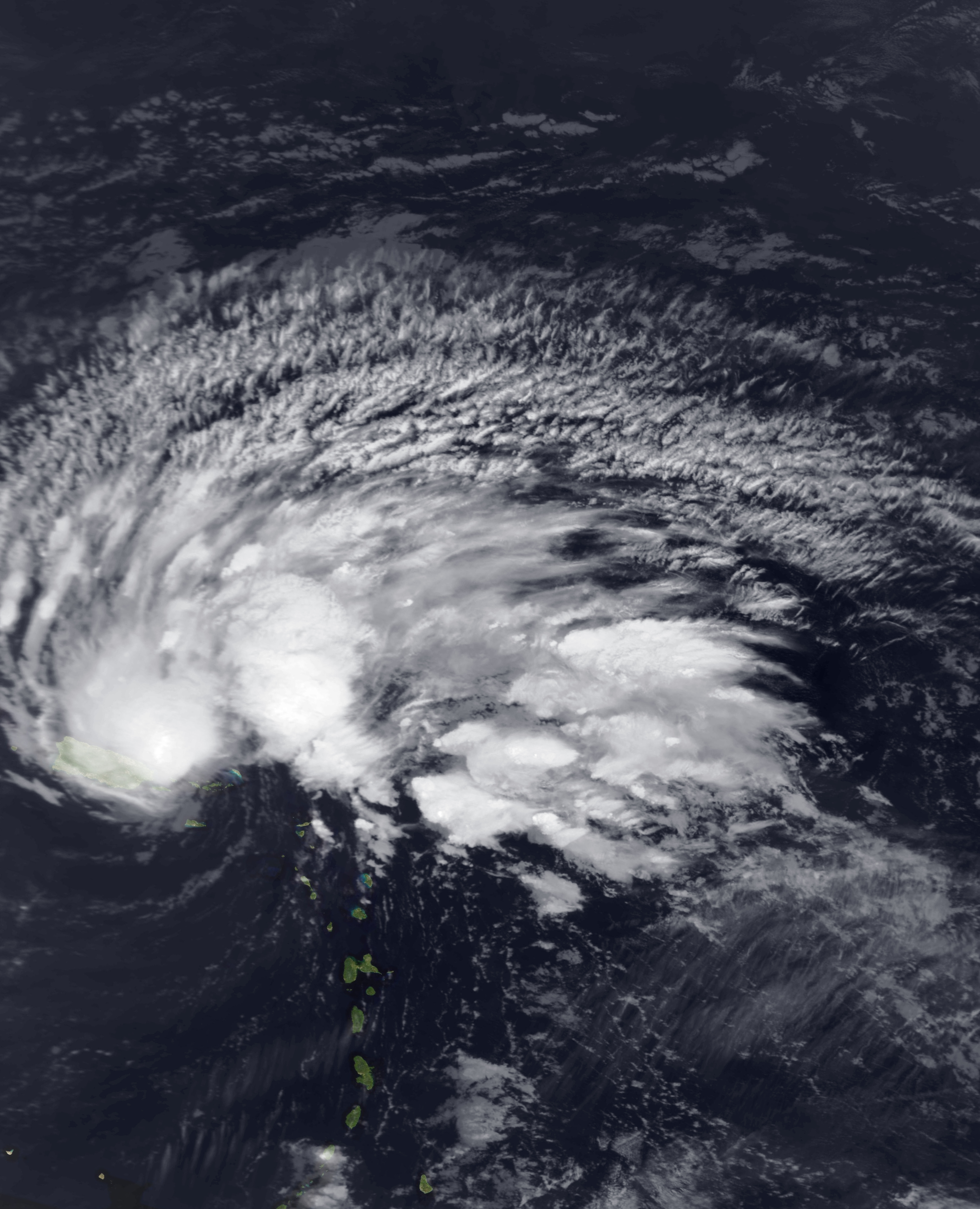
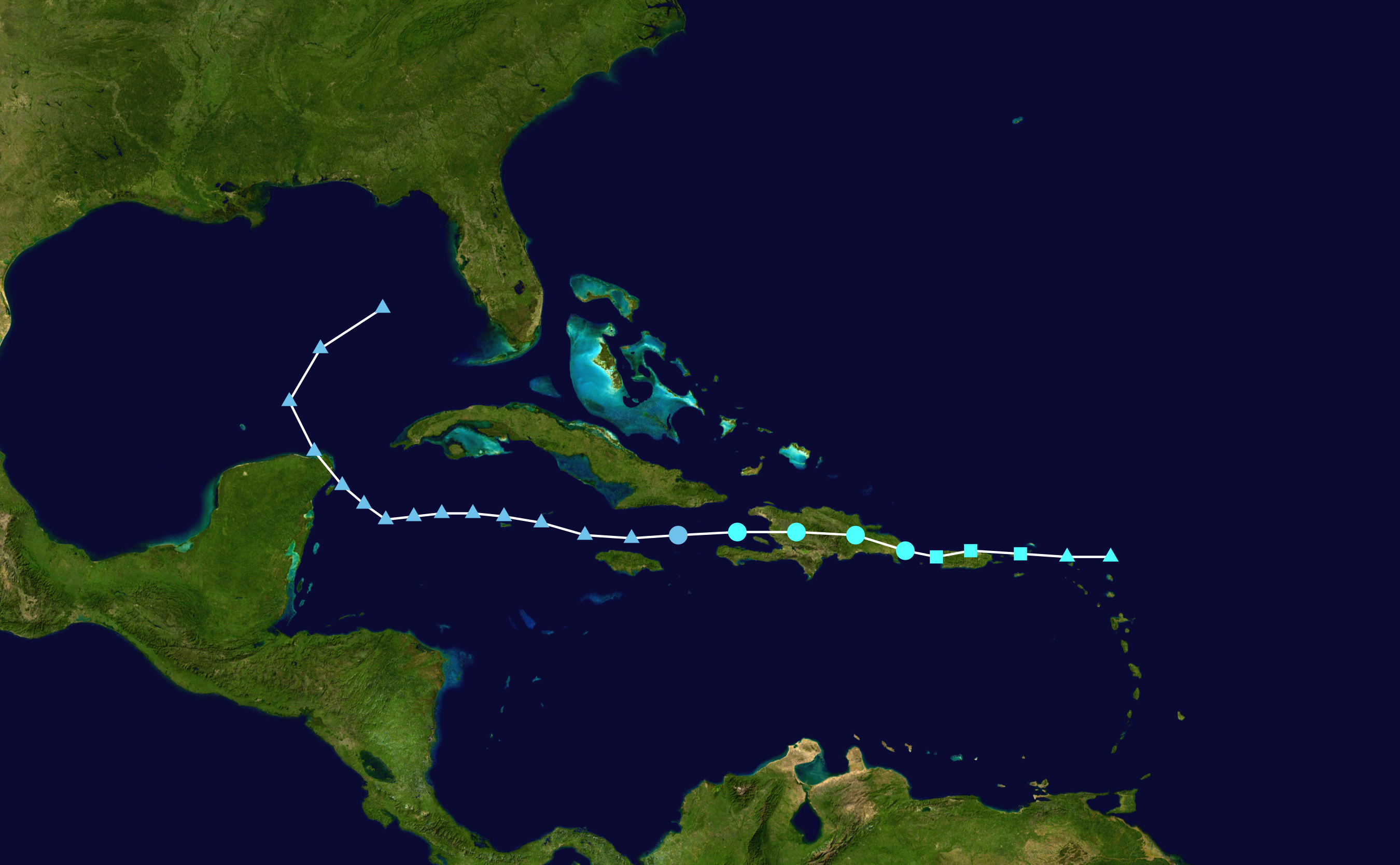
- Duration: December 11 – December 12
- Peak intensity: 60 mph (95 km/h) (1-min); 1003 mbar (hPa)

In the second week of December, after the official end of the hurricane season, a low developed east of the northernmost Lesser Antilles. It slowly acquired tropical characteristics, and early on December 11, the National Hurricane Center declared it Subtropical Storm Olga near Tortola in the British Virgin Islands. Moving westward, Olga struck Puerto Rico near Vega Baja several hours later. Crossing the Mona Passage, the system transitioned into a tropical storm and peaked with winds of 60 mph (95 km/h) and a minimum pressure of 1,003 mbar (29.6 inHg) by the time it made landfall in the Dominican Republic near Punta Cana late on December 11. Olga weakened over Hispaniola and emerged into the Caribbean on December 12. Land interaction, as well as strong wind shear and dry air, caused Olga to weaken into a remnant low late on December 12. The remnants reached Florida by December 16, at which time they were absorbed by a cold front.

The storm impacted many areas affected by Tropical Storm Noel a month earlier. In Puerto Rico, Olga left rough 79,000 people without electricity and 144,000 without water. One person died after a mudslide buried a car. The swelling of the Yaque del Norte River in the Dominican Republic led officials to open floodgates at a dam. This led to a surge of water that killed at least 35 people and flooded homes in seven towns. Two other people died in the country. Olga damaged over 7,500 homes in the Dominican Republic and caused approximately $45 million in damage. Two more deaths occurred in Haiti. Throughout the Greater Antilles, almost 12,000 homes were damaged, of which 370 were completely destroyed. A tornado in Pasco County, Florida, damaged several buildings.

== Storm names ==
The following list of names was used for named storms that formed in the North Atlantic in 2007. This is the same list used for the 2001 season, except for Andrea, Ingrid, and Melissa, which replaced Allison, Iris, and Michelle, respectively. Each of the new names was used for the first time in 2007.

- Andrea
- Barry
- Chantal
- Dean
- Erin
- Felix
- Gabrielle
- Humberto
- Ingrid
- Jerry
- Karen
- Lorenzo
- Melissa
- Noel
- Olga
- Pablo (unused)
- Rebekah (unused)
- Sebastien (unused)
- Tanya (unused)
- Van (unused)
- Wendy (unused)

=== Retirement ===
On May 13, 2008, at the 30th Session of the World Meteorological Organization's Regional Association IV Hurricane Committee, the WMO retired the names Dean, Felix, and Noel from its Atlantic hurricane name lists, and they will not be used again for another Atlantic hurricane. They were replaced with Dorian, Fernand, and Nestor for the 2013 season.

== Season effects ==
This is a table of all of the storms that formed in the 2007 Atlantic hurricane season. It includes their name, duration, peak classification and intensities, areas affected, damage, and death totals. Deaths in parentheses are additional and indirect (an example of an indirect death would be a traffic accident), but were still related to that storm. Damage and deaths include totals while the storm was extratropical, a wave, or a low, and all of the damage figures are in 2007 USD.

Saffir–Simpson scale
TD	TS	C1	C2	C3	C4	C5

2007 North Atlantic tropical cyclone season statistics
Storm name	Dates active	Storm category at peak intensity	Max 1-min wind mph (km/h)	Min. press. (mbar)	Areas affected	Damage (US$)	Deaths	Ref(s).
Andrea	May 9–11	Subtropical storm	60 (95)	1000	Southeastern United States, The Bahamas	Unknown	0 (6)	
Barry	June 1–5	Tropical storm	60 (95)	997	Central America, Greater Antilles, East Coast of the United States	$118,000	1 (2)	
Chantal	July 31 – August 1	Tropical storm	50 (85)	994	Bermuda, Atlantic Canada, Newfoundland	$24.3 million	None	
Dean	August 13–23	Category 5 hurricane	175 (280)	905	Lesser Antilles, Greater Antilles, Lucayan Archipelago, Central America, Yucatan Peninsula, Eastern Mexico	$1.66 billion	40 (5)	
Erin	August 15 – 17	Tropical storm	40 (65)	1003	Gulf Coast of the United States	$76.63 million	16	
Felix	August 31 – September 5	Category 5 hurricane	175 (280)	929	West Indies, South America, Leeward Antilles, Central America, Yucatan Peninsula	$720 million	130 (3)	
Gabrielle	September 8 – 11	Tropical storm	60 (95)	1004	Gulf Coast of the United States	$5,000	0 (1)	
Ingrid	September 12 – 17	Tropical storm	45 (75)	1002	None	None	None	
Humberto	September 12 – 14	Category 1 hurricane	90 (150)	985	Gulf Coast of the United States	$50 million	(1)	
Ten	September 21 – 22	Tropical depression	35 (55)	1005	Gulf Coast of the United States	$6.2 million	(1)	
Jerry	September 23 – 24	Tropical storm	40 (65)	1003	None	None	None	
Karen	September 25 – 29	Category 1 hurricane	75 (120)	988	None	None	None	
Lorenzo	September 25 – 28	Category 1 hurricane	80 (130)	990	Central Mexico	$92.3 million	6	
Melissa	September 28 – 30	Tropical storm	40 (65)	1005	None	None	None	
Fifteen	October 11 – 12	Tropical depression	35 (55)	1011	None	None	None	
Noel	October 28 – November 2	Category 1 hurricane	80 (140)	980	Leeward Islands, Greater Antilles, Lucayan Archipelago, East Coast of the United States, Atlantic Canada, Western Europe	$580 million	>164	
Olga	December 11 – 13	Tropical storm	60 (95)	1003	Greater Antilles, Lucayan Archipelago, Yucatán Peninsula, Southeastern United States	$45 million	40	
Season aggregates
17 systems	May 9 – December 13		175 (280)	905		$3.24 billion	397 (19)	

== See also ==
- Tropical cyclones in 2007
- 2007 Pacific hurricane season
- 2007 Pacific typhoon season
- 2007 North Indian Ocean cyclone season
- South-West Indian Ocean cyclone seasons: 2006–07, 2007–08
- Australian region cyclone seasons: 2006–07, 2007–08
- South Pacific cyclone seasons: 2006–07, 2007–08
