= Comisión Permanente de Contingencias =

Honduran government agency

Agency overview
- Jurisdiction: Government of Honduras
- Headquarters: Edificio COPECO carretera a Mateo; Comayagüela, M.D.C
- Agency executive: Moisés Alvarado, President
- Website: copeco.gob.hn

The Permanent Contingency Commission of Honduras (Spanish: Comisión Permanente de Contingencias, COPECO), is an entity created to coordinate public and private disaster relief efforts in the framework of the National Risk Management System of Honduras (Spanish: Sistema Nacional de Gestión de Riesgos).

COPECO is part of a Central American network of governmental disaster relief agencies known as the Coordination Center for the Prevention of Natural Disasters in Central America (Spanish: Centro de Coordinación para la Prevención de los Desastres Naturales en América Central, CEPREDENAC). CEPREDENAC was created in the context of the Central American Integration System (SICA).
