= List of storms named Ten =

Tropical Depression Ten may refer to several different tropical cyclones named Ten.

In the Atlantic Ocean:

- Tropical Storm Ten (1956)
- Hurricane Ten (1962)
- Tropical Storm Ten (1965)
- Tropical Depression Ten of the 1967 Atlantic hurricane season
- The 10th tropical depression of the 1969 Atlantic hurricane season
- Tropical Depression Ten of the 1970 Atlantic hurricane season
- Tropical Depression Ten of the 1972 Atlantic hurricane season
- Tropical Depression Ten of the 1975 Atlantic hurricane season
- Tropical Depression Ten of the 1976 Atlantic hurricane season
- Tropical Depression Ten, a storm in the 1988 Atlantic hurricane season
- Tropical Depression Ten (1991)
- Tropical Depression Ten (1993)
- Tropical Depression Ten (1994)
- Tropical Depression Ten (2004)
- Tropical Depression Ten (2005)
- Tropical Depression Ten (2007)
- Tropical Depression Ten (2011)
- Tropical Depression Ten (2020)

In the Eastern Pacific Ocean:

- Tropical Depression Ten-E, a storm in the 1978 Pacific hurricane season
- Tropical Depression Ten-E (2010)
