= Timeline of the 2007 Atlantic hurricane season =

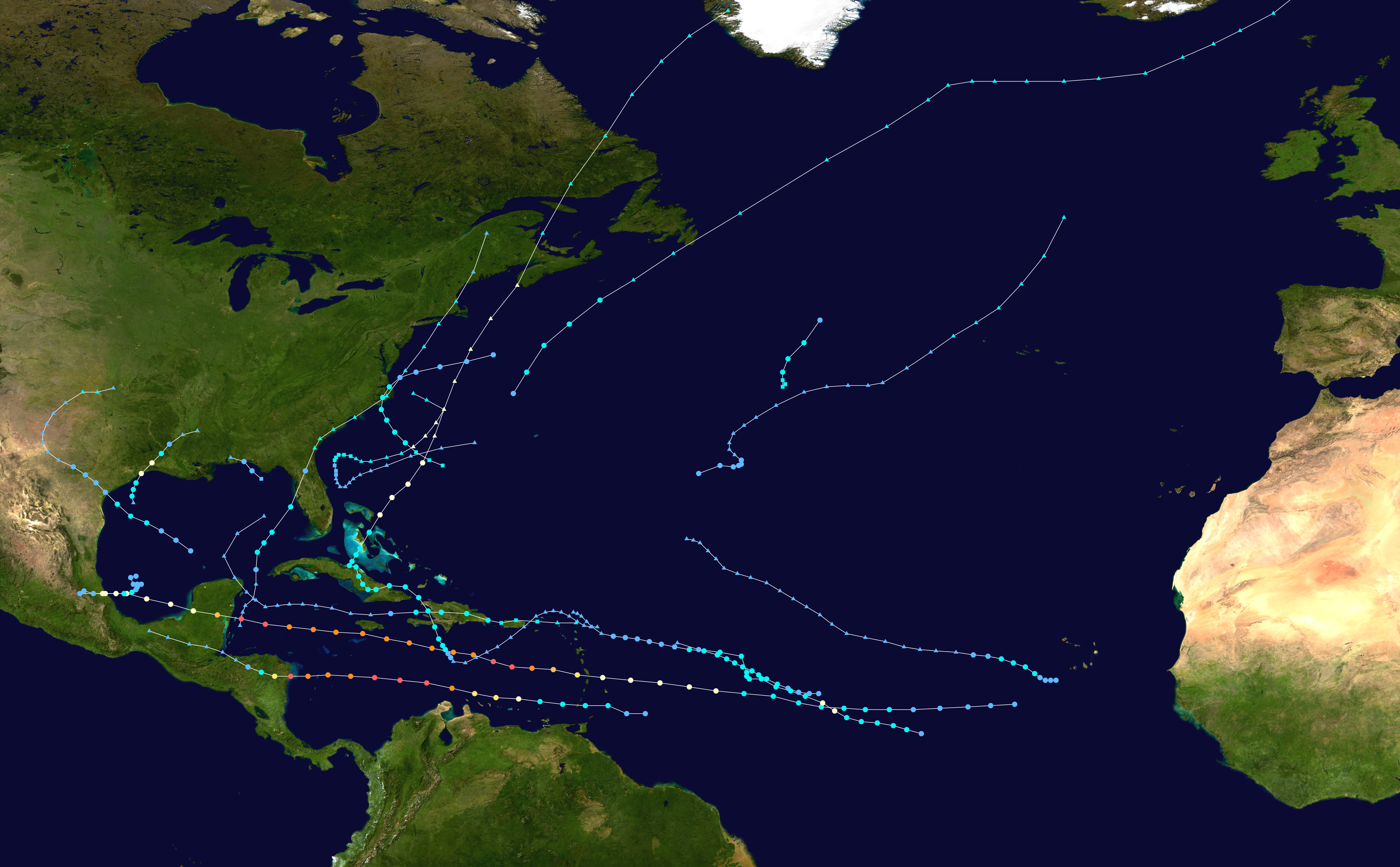
- Season summary map

Season boundaries
- First system formed: May 9, 2007
- Last system dissipated: December 14, 2007

Strongest system
- Name: Dean
- Maximum winds: 175 mph (280 km/h) (1-minute sustained)
- Lowest pressure: 905 mbar (hPa; 26.72 inHg)

Longest lasting system
- Name: Dean
- Duration: 10 days
Storm articles
- Subtropical Storm Andrea (2007)
- Tropical Storm Barry (2007)
- Tropical Storm Chantal (2007)
- Hurricane Dean
- Tropical Storm Erin (2007)
- Hurricane Felix
- Tropical Storm Gabrielle (2007)
- Hurricane Humberto (2007)
- Tropical Depression Ten (2007)
- Hurricane Lorenzo (2007)
- Hurricane Noel
- Tropical Storm Olga (2007)

The 2007 Atlantic hurricane season was an event in the annual tropical cyclone season in the north Atlantic Ocean. An above-average Atlantic hurricane season, (Note: An average season, as defined by the National Oceanic and Atmospheric Administration, has twelve tropical storms, six hurricanes and two major hurricanes.) September had a record-tying eight storms, although the strength and duration of most of the storms was low. Also, for only the second time in recorded history, an Atlantic hurricane, Felix, and an eastern Pacific hurricane, Henriette, made landfall on the same day.

The season officially began on June 1, 2007, and ended on November 30, 2007, dates that conventionally delimit the period of each year when most tropical cyclones develop in the Atlantic basin. The season's first storm, Subtropical Storm Andrea, developed from an extratropical cyclone that formed on May 6, and the last, Tropical Storm Olga, dissipated on December 11. Altogether, there were 15 named tropical storms during the 2007 season. Six storms attained hurricane strength with two intensifying further into major hurricanes. (Note: Hurricanes reaching Category 3 (wind speeds of 111 miles per hour (179 km/h)) or higher on the 5-level Saffir–Simpson wind speed scale are considered major hurricanes.)

This timeline documents tropical cyclone formations, strengthening, weakening, landfalls, extratropical transitions, and dissipations during the season. It includes information that was not released throughout the season, meaning that data from post-storm reviews by the National Hurricane Center, such as a storm that was not initially warned upon, has been included.

The time stamp for each event is first stated using Coordinated Universal Time (UTC), the 24-hour clock where 00:00 = midnight UTC. The NHC uses both UTC and the time zone where the center of the tropical cyclone is currently located. The time zones utilized (east to west) prior to 2020 were: Atlantic, Eastern, and Central. In this timeline, the respective area time is included in parentheses. Additionally, figures for maximum sustained winds and position estimates are rounded to the nearest 5 units (miles, or kilometers), following National Hurricane Center practice. Direct wind observations are rounded to the nearest whole number. Atmospheric pressures are listed to the nearest millibar and nearest hundredth of an inch of mercury.

== Timeline ==
=== May ===
May 9

Subtropical Storm Andrea off the coast of Florida

- 2 a.m. EDT (0600 UTC) – Subtropical Storm Andrea forms 150 nautical miles (280 kilometres; 170 miles) east of Jacksonville, Florida.

May 10
- 8 a.m. EDT (1200 UTC) – Subtropical Storm Andrea weakens into a subtropical depression.

May 11
- 2 a.m. EDT (0600 UTC May 11) – Subtropical Depression Andrea degenerates into a remnant low.

=== June ===
June 1
- 12 a.m. EDT (0400 UTC) – The 2007 Atlantic hurricane season officially begins.
- 8 a.m. EDT (1200 UTC) – A tropical depression forms just northwest of the western tip of Cuba.
- 2 p.m. EDT (1800 UTC) – The tropical depression near Cuba strengthens into Tropical Storm Barry.

June 2
- 10 a.m. EDT (1400 UTC) – Tropical Storm Barry weakens into a tropical depression as it makes landfall near Tampa Bay with 35 mph (56 km/h) winds.
- 8 p.m. EDT (0000 UTC June 3) – Tropical Depression Barry becomes extratropical.

=== July ===
July 30
- 8 p.m. EDT (0000 UTC July 31) – Tropical Depression Three forms 270 miles (430 km) north-northwest of Bermuda.

July 31
- 2 a.m. EDT (0600 UTC) – Tropical Depression Three is upgraded to Tropical Storm Chantal.

=== August ===
August 1
- 2 a.m. EDT (0600 UTC) – Tropical Storm Chantal becomes extratropical.

August 13
- 2 a.m. EDT (0600 UTC) – Tropical Depression Four forms 520 miles (840 km) west-southwest of the southernmost Cape Verde islands.

August 14
- 8 a.m. AST (1200 UTC) – Tropical Depression Four is upgraded to Tropical Storm Dean.
- 7 p.m. CDT (0000 UTC August 15) – Tropical Depression Five forms in Central Gulf of Mexico.

August 15
- 1 p.m. CDT (1800 UTC) – Tropical Depression Five is upgraded to Tropical Storm Erin.

August 16
- 2 a.m. AST (0600 UTC) – Tropical Storm Dean is upgraded to Hurricane Dean.
- 5:30 a.m. CDT (1030 UTC) – Tropical Storm Erin makes landfall near San José Island, Texas with 35 mph (56 km/h).
- 7 a.m. CDT (1200 UTC) – Tropical Storm Erin is downgraded to a tropical depression.
- 8 a.m. AST (1200 UTC) – Hurricane Dean is upgraded to a Category 2 hurricane.

August 17
- 7 a.m. CDT (1200 UTC) – Tropical Depression Erin is downgraded to a remnant low about 50 nautical miles south of San Angelo, Texas.
- 2 p.m. EDT (1800 UTC) – Hurricane Dean is upgraded to a Category 3 hurricane, becoming the first major hurricane of the season.
- 8 p.m. EDT (0000 UTC August 18) – Hurricane Dean is upgraded to a Category 4 hurricane.

August 18
- 2 a.m. EDT (0600 UTC) – Hurricane Dean is upgraded to a Category 5 hurricane.
- 2 p.m. EDT (1800 UTC) – Hurricane Dean is downgraded to a Category 4 hurricane.

August 20

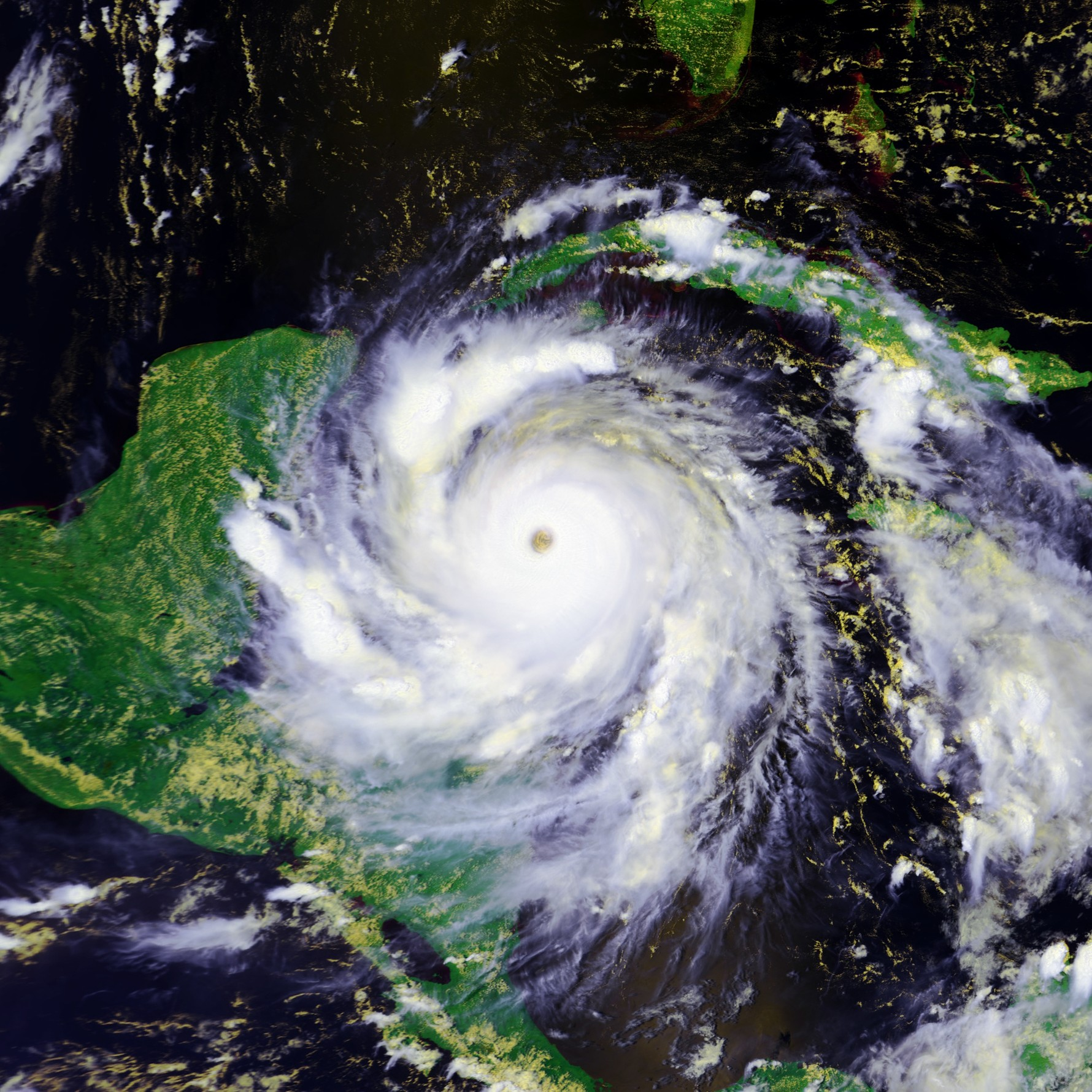
Hurricane Dean near its first landfall.

- 8 p.m. EDT (0000 UTC August 21) – Hurricane Dean is re-upgraded to a Category 5 hurricane.

August 21
- 3:30 a.m. CDT (0830 UTC) – Hurricane Dean makes landfall near Majahual, Mexico with 175 mph (282 km/h) winds.

August 22
- c. 11:30 a.m. CDT (1630 UTC) – Hurricane Dean is again upgraded to a Category 2 hurricane.
- 11:30 a.m. CDT (1630 UTC) – Hurricane Dean makes its second landfall, near Tecolutla, Veracruz with 100 mph (160 km/h) winds.
- 7 p.m. CDT (0000 UTC August 23) – Hurricane Dean is downgraded to a tropical depression inland over Mexico.

August 23
- 1 a.m. CDT (0600 UTC) – Tropical Depression Dean dissipates inland over Mexico.

August 31
- 8 a.m. AST (1200 UTC) – Tropical Depression Six forms east of the Windward Islands.
- 8 p.m. AST (0000 UTC September 1) – Tropical Depression Six is upgraded to Tropical Storm Felix.

=== September ===
September 1
- 4:45 a.m. AST (0845 UTC) – Tropical Storm Felix makes landfall on Grenada with 50 mph (80 km/h) winds.
- 8 p.m. AST (0000 UTC September 2) – Tropical Storm Felix is upgraded to Hurricane Felix.

September 2

Hurricane Felix near peak intensity, as seen from the International Space Station.

- 2 a.m. AST (0600 UTC) – Hurricane Felix is upgraded to a Category 2 hurricane.
- 2 p.m. AST (1800 UTC) – Hurricane Felix is upgraded to a Category 4 hurricane.

September 3
- 2 a.m. AST (0600 UTC) – Hurricane Felix is upgraded to the second Category 5 hurricane of the season.

September 4
- 8 a.m. EDT (1200 UTC) – Hurricane Felix makes landfall near Punta Gorda, Nicaragua with 160 mph (260 km/h) winds.
- 8 p.m. AST (0000 UTC September 5) – Hurricane Felix is downgraded to a tropical storm.

September 5
- 2 a.m. CDT (0600 UTC) – Tropical Storm Felix is downgraded to a tropical depression.
- 8 a.m. CDT (1200 UTC) – Tropical Depression Felix is downgraded to a remnant low.

September 7
- 8 p.m. EDT (0000 UTC September 8) – Subtropical Storm Gabrielle forms 385 mi (620 km) South-East of Cape Lookout, North Carolina.

September 8
- 2 p.m. EDT (1800 UTC) – Subtropical Storm Gabrielle becomes Tropical Storm Gabrielle.

September 9
- 11:30 a.m. EDT (1530 UTC) – Tropical Storm Gabrielle makes landfall near the Cape Lookout National Seashore with 60 mph (97 km/h) winds.

September 10
- 2 a.m. EDT (0600 UTC) – Tropical Storm Gabrielle is downgraded to a tropical depression.

September 11
- 8 a.m. EDT (1200 UTC) – Tropical Depression Gabrielle dissipates.

September 12
- 8 a.m. EDT (1200 UTC) – Tropical Depression Eight forms east of the Lesser Antilles.
- 8 a.m. EDT (1200 UTC) – Tropical Storm Humberto forms in the Gulf of Mexico, southeast of Houston, Texas.
September 13
- 1 a.m. CDT (0600 UTC) – Tropical Storm Humberto is upgraded to Hurricane Humberto.
- 2 a.m. AST (0600 UTC) – Tropical Depression Eight is upgraded to Tropical Storm Ingrid.
- 2 a.m. CDT (0700 UTC) – Hurricane Humberto makes landfall just east of High Island, Texas with 90 mph (140 km/h) winds.
- 1 a.m. CDT (1800 UTC) – Hurricane Humberto is downgraded to a tropical storm.
- 7 p.m. CDT (0000 UTC September 14) – Tropical Storm Humberto is downgraded to a tropical depression.

September 14
- 7 p.m. CDT (0600 UTC) – Tropical Depression Humberto is downgraded to a low.

September 15
- 2 p.m. AST (1800 UTC) – Tropical Storm Ingrid is downgraded to a tropical depression.

September 17
- 2 a.m. AST (0600 UTC) – Tropical Depression Ingrid is downgraded to a remnant low.

September 21

Tropical Depression Ten near landfall

- 7 a.m. CDT (1200 UTC) – Subtropical Depression Ten forms in the Gulf of Mexico, south of the Florida Panhandle.
- 1 p.m. CDT (1800 UTC) – Subtropical Depression Ten is reclassified as Tropical Depression Ten.
- 7 p.m. CDT (0000 UTC September 22) – Tropical Depression Ten makes landfall near Fort Walton Beach, Florida with 30 mph (48 km/h) winds.

September 22
- 1 a.m. CDT (0600 UTC) – Tropical Depression Ten degenerates to a remnant low.
- 7 p.m. CDT (0000 UTC September 23) – Subtropical Depression Eleven forms in the open Atlantic Ocean.

September 23
- 1 a.m. CDT (0600 UTC) – Subtropical Depression Eleven is upgraded to Subtropical Storm Jerry.
- 8 p.m. AST (0000 UTC September 24) – Subtropical Storm Jerry is reclassified as Tropical Storm Jerry.

September 24
- 2 p.m. AST (1800 UTC) – Tropical Storm Jerry is downgraded to a tropical depression.
- 8 p.m. AST (0000 UTC September 25) – Tropical Depression Jerry dissipates.
- 8 p.m. AST (0000 UTC September 25) – Tropical Depression Twelve forms east of the southern Windward Islands.

September 25
- 2 a.m. AST (0600 UTC) – Tropical Depression Twelve is upgraded to Tropical Storm Karen.
- 1 p.m. CDT (1800 UTC) – Tropical Depression Thirteen forms east of Tampico in the southern Gulf of Mexico.

September 26
- 8 a.m. AST (1200 UTC) – Tropical Storm Karen strengthens into Hurricane Karen.
- 8 p.m. AST (0000 UTC September 27) – Hurricane Karen weakens to a tropical storm.

September 27
- 7 a.m. CDT (1200 UTC) – Tropical Depression Thirteen is upgraded to Tropical Storm Lorenzo.
- 7 p.m. CDT (0000 UTC September 28) – Tropical Storm Lorenzo is upgraded to Hurricane Lorenzo.

September 28
- 12 a.m. CDT (0500 UTC) – Hurricane Lorenzo makes landfall Tecolutla, Veracruz, Mexico with 75 mph (121 km/h) winds.
- 2 a.m. AST (0600 UTC) – Tropical Depression Fourteen forms southwest of Cape Verde.
- 7 a.m. CDT (1200 UTC) – Hurricane Lorenzo is downgraded to a tropical depression.
- 7 p.m. CDT (0000 UTC September 29) – Tropical Depression Lorenzo dissipates inland Mexico.

September 29
- 2 a.m. AST (0600 UTC) – Tropical Depression Fourteen is upgraded to Tropical Storm Melissa.
- 2 a.m. EDT (0600 UTC) – Tropical Storm Karen is downgraded to a tropical depression.
- 8 a.m. AST (1200 UTC) – Tropical Depression Karen is downgraded to a low just to the east of the Leeward Islands.

September 30
- 2 a.m. AST (0600 UTC) – Tropical Storm Melissa is downgraded to a tropical depression.
- 1 p.m. AST (1800 UTC) – Tropical Depression Melissa degenerates into a remnant low.

=== October ===
October 11
- 8 a.m. AST (1200 UTC) – Tropical Depression Fifteen forms east of Bermuda.

October 12
- 8 p.m. AST (0000 UTC October 13) – Tropical Depression Fifteen degenerates into a remnant low.

October 27
- 8 p.m. EDT (0000 UTC October 28) – Tropical Depression Sixteen forms in the central Caribbean Sea.

October 28
- 8 a.m. EDT (1200 UTC) – Tropical Depression Sixteen strengthens into Tropical Storm Noel.

October 29
- 3 a.m. EDT (0700 UTC) – Tropical Storm Noel makes its first landfall in Jacmel, Haiti with 50 mph (80 km/h) winds.

October 30
- 2 a.m. EDT (0600 UTC) – Tropical Storm Noel makes its second landfall near Guardalavaca, Cuba with 60 mph (97 km/h) winds.

=== November ===
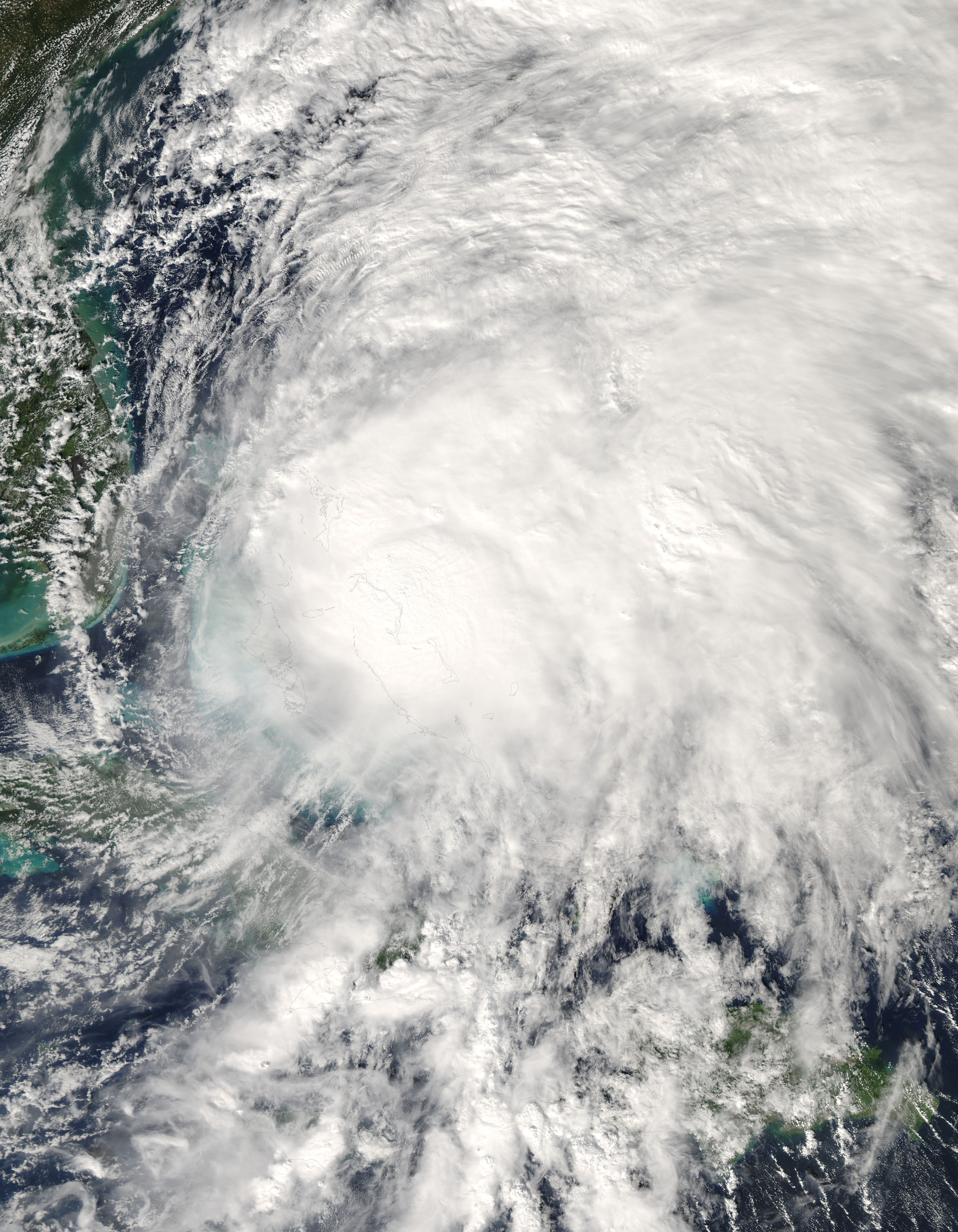
Tropical Storm Noel passing over the Bahamas

November 1
- 9:15 a.m. EDT (1315 UTC) – Tropical Storm Noel makes its third landfall on Andros, Bahamas, with winds of 60 mph (97 km/h).
- 1:15 a.m. EDT (1745 UTC) – Tropical Storm Noel makes its fourth landfall on New Providence, Nassau, Bahamas, with winds of 65 mph (105 km/h).
- 8 p.m. EDT (0000 UTC November 2) – Tropical Storm Noel strengthens into Hurricane Noel.

November 2
- 8 p.m EDT (0000 UTC November 3) – Hurricane Noel becomes extratropical.

November 30
- 11:59 p.m EST (0459 UTC December 1) – The 2007 hurricane season officially ends.

=== December ===
December 10
- 9:45 p.m. AST (0045 UTC December 11) – Subtropical Storm Olga forms north of Puerto Rico.

December 11
- 2 p.m. AST (1800 UTC) – Subtropical Storm Olga makes landfall in north central Puerto Rico, just west of Vega Baja, with 45 mph (72 km/h) winds.
- 2 p.m. AST (1800 UTC) – Subtropical Storm Olga is reclassified as Tropical Storm Olga.
- 2 p.m. AST (1800 UTC) – Tropical Storm Olga makes landfall just south of Punta Cana, Dominican Republic with 60 mph (97 km/h) winds.

December 12
- 1 p.m. EST (1800 UTC) – Tropical Storm Olga weakens to a tropical depression.
- 7 p.m. EST (0000 UTC December 13) – Tropical Depression Olga degenerates into a remnant low in the Caribbean Sea.

== See also ==
- Timeline of the 2007 Pacific hurricane season
- Timeline of the 2007 Pacific typhoon season
- Timeline of the 2007 North Indian Ocean cyclone season
- Timeline of the 2007–08 South-West Indian Ocean cyclone season
- Timeline of the 2007–08 South Pacific cyclone season
- Timeline of the 2007–08 Australian region cyclone season
- Timeline of the 2008–09 South-West Indian Ocean cyclone season
- Timeline of the 2008–09 South Pacific cyclone season
- Timeline of the 2008–09 Australian region cyclone season
