= Tropical Storm Gabrielle (2007) =

Atlantic tropical cyclone

- Tropical Storm Gabrielle shortly after landfall in North Carolina on September 9

Meteorological history
- Formed: September 8, 2007
- Dissipated: September 11, 2007

Tropical storm
- 1-minute sustained (SSHWS/NWS)
- Highest winds: 60 mph (95 km/h)
- Lowest pressure: 1004 mbar (hPa); 29.65 inHg

Overall effects
- Fatalities: 1 indirect
- Damage: Minimal
- Areas affected: North Carolina
- IBTrACS
- Part of the 2007 Atlantic hurricane season

Tropical Storm Gabrielle was a short-lived tropical cyclone. The seventh named storm of the 2007 Atlantic hurricane season, Gabrielle developed as a subtropical cyclone on September 8 about 385 miles (620 km) southeast of Cape Lookout, North Carolina. Unfavorable wind shear affected the storm for much of its duration, although a temporary decrease in the shear allowed the cyclone to become a tropical storm. On September 9, Gabrielle made landfall at Cape Lookout National Seashore in the Outer Banks of North Carolina, United States, with winds of 60 mph (97 km/h). Turning to the northeast, the storm quickly weakened and dissipated on September 11.

In advance of the storm, tropical cyclone watches and warnings were issued for coastal areas, while rescue teams and the U.S. Coast Guard were put on standby. The storm dropped heavy rainfall near its immediate landfall location but little precipitation elsewhere. Along the coast of North Carolina, high waves, rip currents, and storm surge were reported. Slight localized flooding was reported. Gusty winds also occurred, though no wind damage was reported. One person drowned in rough surf caused by the storm in Florida. Overall damage was minor.

== Meteorological history ==
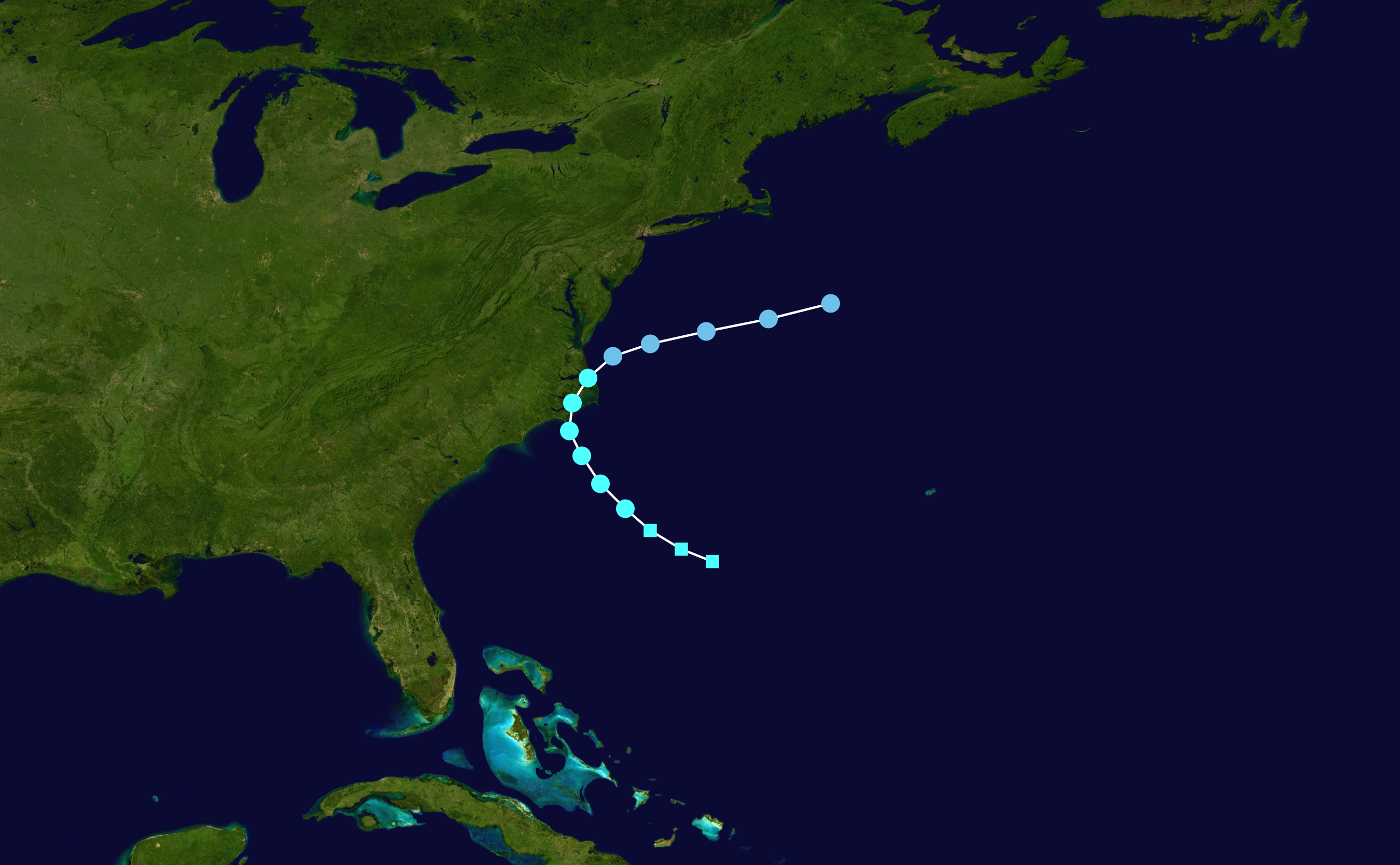
Map plotting the storm's track and intensity, according to the Saffir–Simpson scale Map key Saffir–Simpson scale Tropical depression (≤38 mph, ≤62 km/h) Tropical storm (39–73 mph, 63–118 km/h) Category 1 (74–95 mph, 119–153 km/h) Category 2 (96–110 mph, 154–177 km/h) Category 3 (111–129 mph, 178–208 km/h) Category 4 (130–156 mph, 209–251 km/h) Category 5 (≥157 mph, ≥252 km/h) Unknown Storm type Tropical cyclone Subtropical cyclone Extratropical cyclone, remnant low, tropical disturbance, or monsoon depression

A cold front moved off the southeast coast of the United States on September 1. Gradually decaying, the front degenerated into an area of cloudiness and showers just east of the Georgia coast on September 2. Tracking eastward, a weak low-pressure area developed the next day. It slowly became better organized as its motion became erratic, and by late on September 4 the convection had become concentrated to the east of the center. On September 5, a Hurricane Hunters flight indicated the system had not acquired the characteristics of a tropical or subtropical cyclone. Interaction with an upper-level trough resulted in moderate wind shear which suppressed further development, and by September 6 the thunderstorm activity lost much organization. Then, upper-level winds became increasingly favorable, allowing the convection to concentrate about halfway between North Carolina and Bermuda. With a deep-layer ridge to its north, the system turned to a steady west-northwest track. A reconnaissance aircraft flight late on September 7 reported a very elongated center, with peak flight winds of 55 mph (89 km/h) about 100 miles (160 km) northeast of the center. Subsequent to the flight, the center became slightly better organized, and based on the large wind field and the presence of an upper-level low to its west-southwest, the National Hurricane Center classified the system as Subtropical Storm Gabrielle early on September 8 while located about 385 miles (620 km) southeast of Cape Lookout, North Carolina.

Upon becoming a subtropical cyclone, Gabrielle was located in an area of cooler air to its north, dry air to its south and west, southerly wind shear, and cooler water temperatures along its path. Despite these unfavorable conditions, a curved convective band developed in its northern and western quadrants, and the circulation became better defined. Subsequently, the rainbands in its northeastern quadrant dissipated, leaving the well-defined center far removed from the convection. By later that day, the circulation began to become more involved with the remaining convection. Based on evidence of a weak warm-core, the system was re-designated as Tropical Storm Gabrielle late on September 8 about 185 miles (298 km) southeast of Cape Lookout, North Carolina.

Animation of Tropical Storm Gabrielle making landfall in North Carolina, while being sheared apart

Vertical wind shear decreased as the storm passed over the Gulf Stream, allowing a strong convective burst to develop near the center. As it approached the coast of North Carolina, the center re-developed within the deep convection underneath the mid-level circulation, although increased northerly wind shear displaced the center of Gabrielle to the north of the thunderstorm activity. Based on reports from Hurricane Hunters, it is estimated Gabrielle moved ashore at Cape Lookout National Seashore at 1530 UTC on September 9 with winds of 60 mph (97 km/h), though due to the shear the strongest winds remained offshore. Tracking around the ridge over the western Atlantic, the storm turned to the north and north-northeast, emerging into the ocean near Kill Devil Hills, North Carolina early on September 10 as a poorly organized system with convection far to the south of the center. Gabrielle weakened to a tropical depression shortly thereafter, and maintained scattered convection despite unfavorable wind shear as it tracked along the northern portion of the Gulf Stream. By midday on September 11, the circulation had become ill-defined and elongated; failing to meet the criteria of a tropical cyclone, the National Hurricane Center declared Gabrielle dissipating well to the south of Nova Scotia. By early the next day, the remnants of Gabrielle were absorbed by an approaching cold front.

== Preparations ==
Upon becoming a subtropical cyclone, the National Hurricane Center issued a tropical storm watch from Edisto Beach, South Carolina to Oregon Inlet in North Carolina, including the Pamlico Sound. As the storm approached the coast, the watch south of Cape Fear, North Carolina was discontinued, and a tropical storm warning was issued from Surf City, North Carolina northward to the North Carolina–Virginia state border; a watch was also issued northward to Cape Charles Light on the Delmarva Peninsula, and to New Point Comfort on the western shore of the Chesapeake Bay, which was upgraded to a warning the next day.

Prior to the arrival of the storm, the National Park Service closed visitor centers and campgrounds along the Outer Banks. For about 12 hours, the ferry between Hatteras and Ocracoke was closed. North Carolina Governor Mike Easley put rescue teams and the National Guard on standby. Residents and tourists were advised to secure loose objects, and to remain indoors. As the storm's effects were expected to be minor, no evacuations were ordered. On Ocracoke Island, boats were hauled out. The threat of the storm forced the cancellation of a fishing tournament at Atlantic Beach, which resulted in effects to the local economy.

Initially, uncertainty in Gabrielle's track led the National Hurricane Center's five-day track forecast cone to include the Mid-Atlantic, southeastern New York, and southern New England. Forecasters predicted rough surf and rip currents, prompting the Coast Guard to perform preparations in the Northeastern United States. On Cape Cod, Massachusetts, an HU-25 Falcon jet flew along the coastline, broadcasting storm advisories to offshore vessels. A Coast Guard patrol boat was deployed offshore for search and rescue. Boaters and mariners were advised to exercise caution, and were told to "make safe decisions". However, the storm passed well to the south with little effect.

== Impact ==
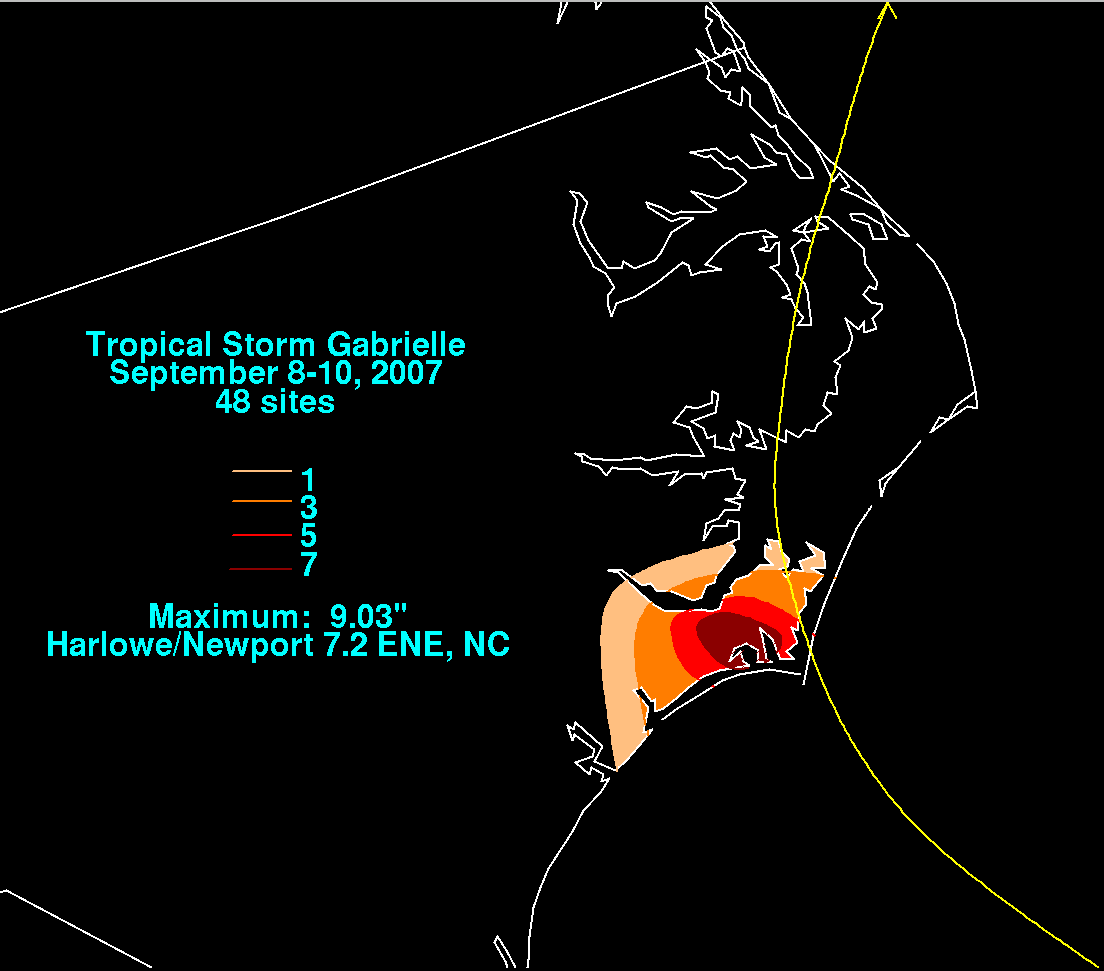
Rainfall summary for Tropical Storm Gabrielle

Rough surf from Gabrielle along the coast of Florida drowned one surfer and forced the rescue of 200 swimmers. Officials at New Smyrna Beach estimated 6 to 9 feet (1.8 to 2.7 m) seas. By early on September 9, the outer rainbands began affecting southeastern North Carolina. Sustained winds of tropical storm force occurred along the coastline, unofficially reaching 44 miles per hour (71 km/h) at Frisco. Wind gusts were stronger, unofficially reaching 61 miles per hour (98 km/h) at Ocracoke. Along the coast, rough surf was reported, and waves reached 10 to 12 feet (3.0 to 3.7 m). Rip currents caused numerous swimmers to be rescued by lifeguards. Heavy rainfall from the storm was confined to near its immediate landfall location, peaking at 9.03 inches (229 mm) at a station 7.2 miles (11.6 km) to the east-northeast of Newport; other areas reported 4 to 8 inches (0.10 to 0.20 m). Two offshore ships observed tropical storm-force winds, though the reports were considered to be overestimated.

In some locations, the rainfall led to flooding, which prevented farmers from harvesting crops. Elsewhere throughout the state, the storm failed to relieve severe drought conditions as it was initially hoped to. The passage of the storm left a portion of North Carolina Highway 12 on Hatteras Island closed for three hours, briefly flooding part of the road. Streets in Morehead City and Beaufort were closed, and several homes and businesses suffered minor flood damage. In Carteret County, the flooding inflicted $5,000 in property damage. Storm surge was fairly light along the coast, peaking at 3 feet (0.91 m) above normal at Hatteras Island. Overall damage in the state was minor, including minor beach erosion and some flooded streets.

== See also ==
- List of storms named Gabrielle
- Timeline of the 2007 Atlantic hurricane season
- List of North Carolina hurricanes (2000–present)
