= Hurricane Felix =

Category 5 Atlantic hurricane in 2007

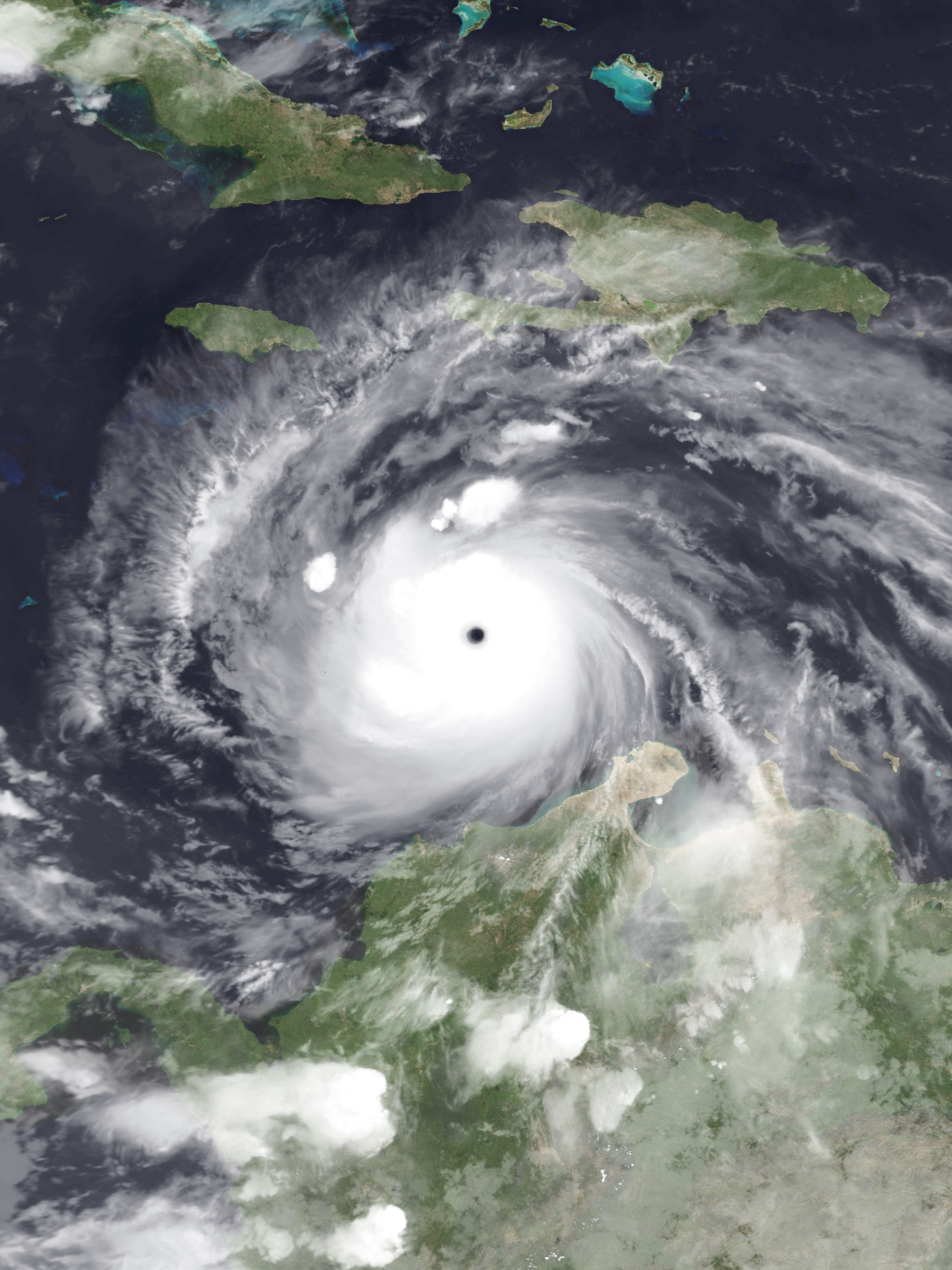
- Felix at peak intensity north of Colombia, early on September 3

Meteorological history
- Formed: August 31, 2007
- Remnant low: September 5, 2007
- Dissipated: September 7, 2007

Category 5 major hurricane
- 1-minute sustained (SSHWS/NWS)
- Highest winds: 175 mph (280 km/h)
- Lowest pressure: 929 mbar (hPa); 27.43 inHg

Overall effects
- Fatalities: 133 (130 direct, 3 indirect)
- Damage: $720 million (2007 USD)
- Areas affected: Trinidad and Tobago, Windward Islands, Venezuela, Leeward Antilles, Aruba, Colombia, Costa Rica, Nicaragua, Honduras, El Salvador, Belize, Guatemala, Mexico
- IBTrACS
- Part of the 2007 Atlantic hurricane season

Hurricane Felix was an extremely powerful and destructive tropical cyclone which became the southernmost-landfalling Category 5 storm on record. It was the sixth named storm, second hurricane, and second Category 5 hurricane of the 2007 Atlantic hurricane season. Felix formed from a tropical wave on August 31, passing through the southern Windward Islands on September 1 before strengthening to attain hurricane status. On the next day, Felix rapidly strengthened into a major hurricane, and early on September 3 it was upgraded to Category 5 status; at 21:00 UTC on the same day, the hurricane was downgraded to Category 4 status, but strengthened into a Category 5 hurricane for the second and final time by the morning of September 4.

On September 4, Felix made landfall just south of the border between Nicaragua and Honduras, causing at least 133 deaths and hundreds of millions of dollars in damages in Central America. Because of its devastating impact on Central America, especially on Nicaragua, its name was retired after the 2007 season.

== Meteorological history ==
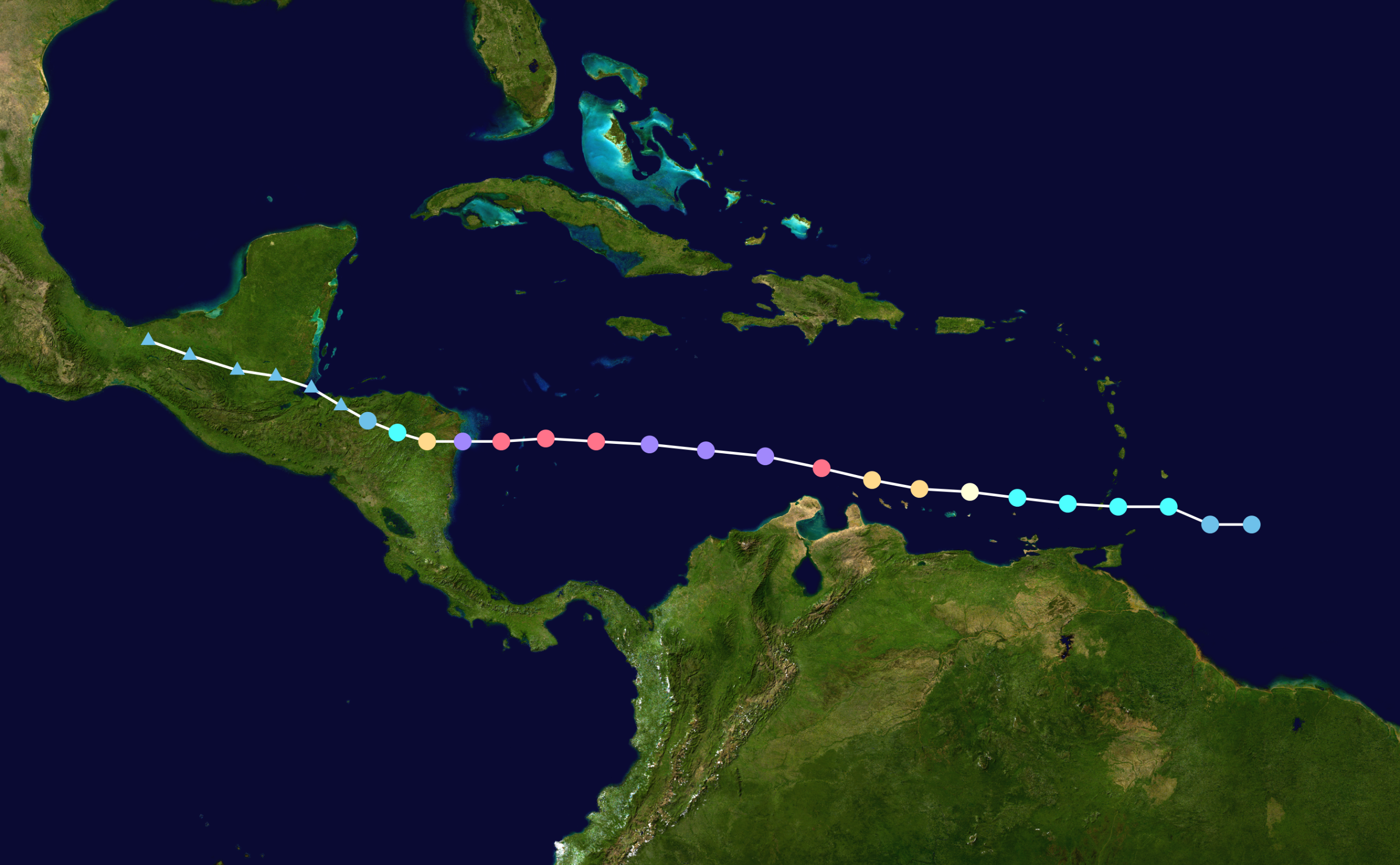
Map plotting the storm's track and intensity, according to the Saffir–Simpson scale Map key Saffir–Simpson scale Tropical depression (≤38 mph, ≤62 km/h) Tropical storm (39–73 mph, 63–118 km/h) Category 1 (74–95 mph, 119–153 km/h) Category 2 (96–110 mph, 154–177 km/h) Category 3 (111–129 mph, 178–208 km/h) Category 4 (130–156 mph, 209–251 km/h) Category 5 (≥157 mph, ≥252 km/h) Unknown Storm type Tropical cyclone Subtropical cyclone Extratropical cyclone, remnant low, tropical disturbance, or monsoon depression

A tropical wave moved off the coast of Africa on August 24, tracking westward at approximately 14 mph (23 km/h) with no associated deep convection and a weak low-level inverted-V curvature. Initially difficult to locate on satellites, the wave axis tracked through a moist environment and developed an area of scattered thunderstorms. By August 25 visible satellite imagery indicated broad cyclonic turning just north of the Intertropical Convergence Zone. The wave continued to develop moderate to strong convection, and on August 27 a 1012 mbar (hPa; 29.88 inHg) low pressure area developed about 830 mi (1,340 km) west-southwest of Praia, Cape Verde. For the next several days the system failed to organize significantly; however, on August 30 the wave became better defined with more representation of the cyclonic turning into the low. Convection increased early the next day, and a Hurricane Hunters flight into the system reported the presence of a closed low-level circulation; accordingly, the National Hurricane Center initiated advisories on Tropical Depression Six at 2100 UTC on August 31 while it was located about 180 mi (290 km) east-southeast of the southern Windward Islands.

Upon becoming a tropical cyclone, the depression was located to the south of a strong ridge, resulting in a west-northwest motion. The system maintained curved rainbands with expanding outflow, and with light wind shear and warm water temperatures the environment favored further development. Its deep convection consolidated very near the center, and shortly after passing over the island of Grenada the depression intensified into Tropical Storm Felix early at around 0900 UTC on September 1. Felix quickly strengthened as it developed a small inner core of convection with tightly wound bands around the center, and by late on September 1 an eye feature was observed on satellite imagery. Based on reports from reconnaissance aircraft, the National Hurricane Center estimated that Felix attained hurricane status by early on September 2 while located about 155 mi (249 km) east-northeast of Bonaire.

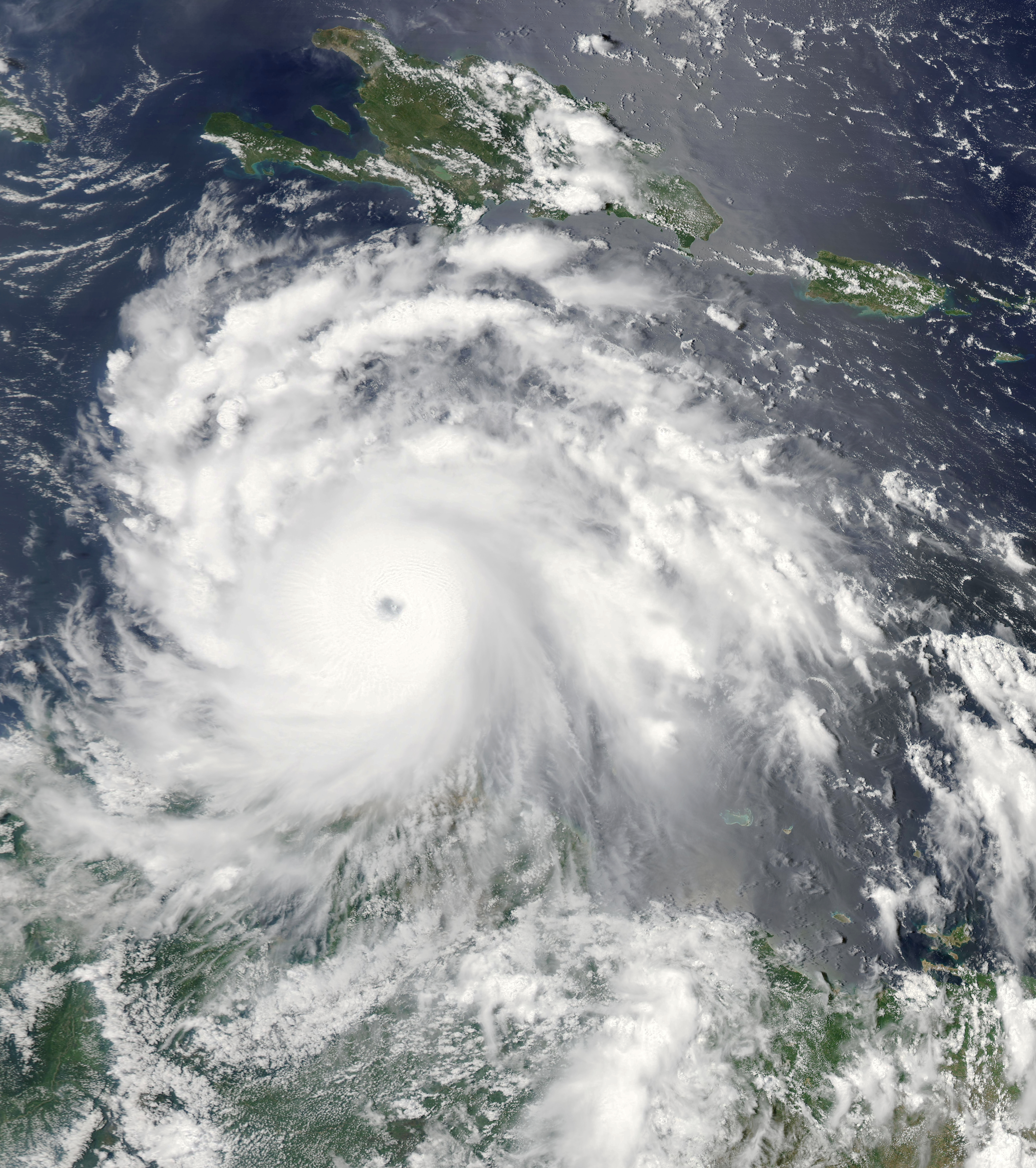
Hurricane Felix rapidly intensifying south of Hispaniola on September 2

Tracking through an area of extremely low wind shear and increasingly high oceanic heat content, Felix quickly developed a well-defined eye, a symmetric cloud structure, and strong upper-level outflow; consequently, the hurricane commenced explosive intensification shortly afterward. Felix attained major hurricane status at around 1800 UTC on September 2 while located about 490 mi (790 km) southeast of Kingston, Jamaica. Rapid strengthening continued, and later that day the hurricane attained Category 4 status on the Saffir-Simpson Hurricane Scale with the pressure dropping to 957 mbar (957 hPa; 28.3 inHg); this corresponded to a falling rate of 3.4 mbar (3.4 hPa; 0.10 inHg) per hour, which the National Hurricane Center described as "one of the more rapid deepening rates we have observed." A Hurricane Hunters flight reported a stadium effect in the eye, and also reported the eye diameter shrank to 14 mi (23 km). A subsequent Hurricane Hunters flight experienced flight level winds of 175 mph (282 km/h), with peak surface winds of 163 mph (262 km/h) reported in the southwest quadrant of the eyewall; surface winds of 189 mph (304 km/h) were found in its northeastern quadrant, although the National Hurricane Center reported the peak reading could have been contaminated due to graupel in the clouds. Based on the observations, it is estimated Felix attained winds of 175 mph (282 km/h) by 0000 UTC on September 3 while located about 390 mi (630 km) southeast of Kingston, Jamaica, making Felix a Category 5 hurricane on the Saffir-Simpson Hurricane Scale. This also makes Felix the second-fastest intensifying Atlantic hurricane on record, just behind Wilma 2 years prior. While investigating the hurricane, Hurricane Hunters encountered extreme turbulence and potentially dangerous graupel, which forced the flight to abort the mission.

Continuing quickly westward, the diameter of the eye decreased to 12 mi (19 km), and the National Hurricane Center estimates the hurricane attained a minimum central pressure of 929 mbar (929 hPa; 27.4 inHg) about seven hours after it reached Category 5 status. Initially, Felix was predicted to track west-northwestward, striking Belize before crossing the Yucatán Peninsula; however, its path remained nearly due westward. Subsequently, cloud tops near the center started to warm as the eye became less distinct, and by 1800 UTC on September 3, Felix weakened to Category 4 status with winds of 145 mph (233 km/h). On September 4, Felix had completed an eyewall replacement cycle and began strengthening again during the day. Felix was upgraded to a Category 5 for the second time at 1040 UTC, and made landfall in Nicaragua just south of its border with Honduras, in the Mosquito Coast region, as a Category 5 hurricane with 160 mph (260 km/h) winds. Hurricane Felix struck Nicaragua on the same day as Hurricane Henriette struck the Baja California Peninsula in the eastern Pacific Ocean, which marked the second recorded occurrence that a North Atlantic hurricane and a Pacific hurricane made landfall on the same day; the previous occurrence was on August 23, 1992, when Hurricane Andrew hit the Bahamas on the same day Hurricane Lester hit Mexico's Baja California Peninsula. By nine hours after moving ashore, the system maintained a well-organized cloud pattern and intense rainbands, although the winds rapidly decreased; early on September 5 Felix weakened to a tropical storm as its upper-level circulation became detached from the low-level portion. The system deteriorated to a tropical depression as it crossed into southern Honduras, and at 0900 UTC the National Hurricane Center issued the last advisory on Felix as it began degenerating into a broad low pressure area. The remnants of Felix tracked west-northwestward over other portions of Latin America, and eventually dissipated over the Mexican state of Tabasco on September 7.

== Preparations ==
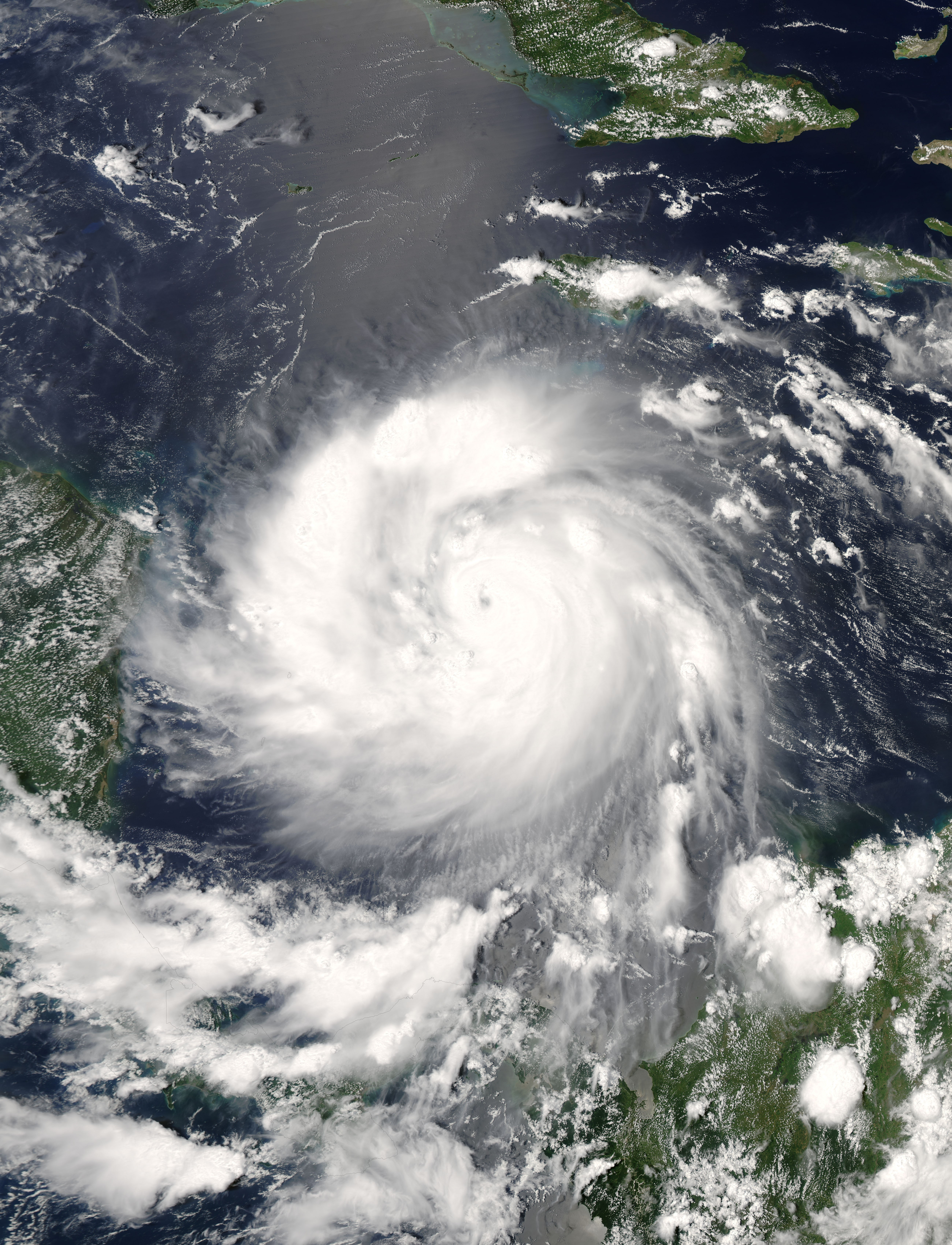
Hurricane Felix in the western Caribbean Sea, nearing Central America on September 3

Upon Felix's becoming a tropical cyclone, a tropical storm warning was issued for Saint Vincent and the Grenadines, Tobago, and Grenada and its dependencies; a tropical storm watch was also issued for the northeastern Venezuela coast from Cumaná to Pedernales, including Isla Margarita, as well as the ABC islands. The National Emergency Management Agency of Tobago was fully activated, with 79 shelters opened on the island. Coinciding with the upgrade of Felix to tropical storm status, the watch for the ABC islands was upgraded to a tropical storm warning. A hurricane watch was added to the islands early on September 2, where several tourists attempted to leave by plane prior to the arrival of the storm. Early on September 2, the government of Jamaica issued a tropical storm watch for the island, which was canceled as the hurricane passed far to its south. Later on September 2, a tropical storm watch was issued for Grand Cayman, and the next day a tropical storm warning was put in place on Providencia Island. A hurricane watch was issued for the Caribbean coast of Guatemala and the entire coastline of Belize at 1200 UTC on September 3.

At 0300 UTC on September 3, the government of Honduras issued a hurricane watch from Limón to the Honduras/Nicaragua border, which was upgraded to a hurricane warning six hours later. At the same time, a hurricane watch was extended westward to the Honduras/Guatemala border, and early on September 4 a tropical storm warning was put in place for the same region. Officials ordered evacuations for citizens in low-lying areas near the coastline; by midday on September 3, around 300 tourists evacuated from the Bay Islands department, with an additional 400 preparing to leave by plane; approximately 2,000 people were evacuated from coastal areas. By the time the hurricane made landfall, about 20,000 people in Honduras left for safer areas.

At 1500 UTC on September 3, about 21 hours before its final landfall, the government of Nicaragua issued a hurricane warning from Puerto Cabezas northward to the national border. About 12 hours before landfall, a tropical storm warning was issued from Puerto Cabezas southward to Prinzapolka. Prior to the arrival of the hurricane, officials sent about 140,000 lbs (63,000 kg) of meals and emergency supplies to near the landfall location.

== Impact ==
=== Caribbean Islands ===
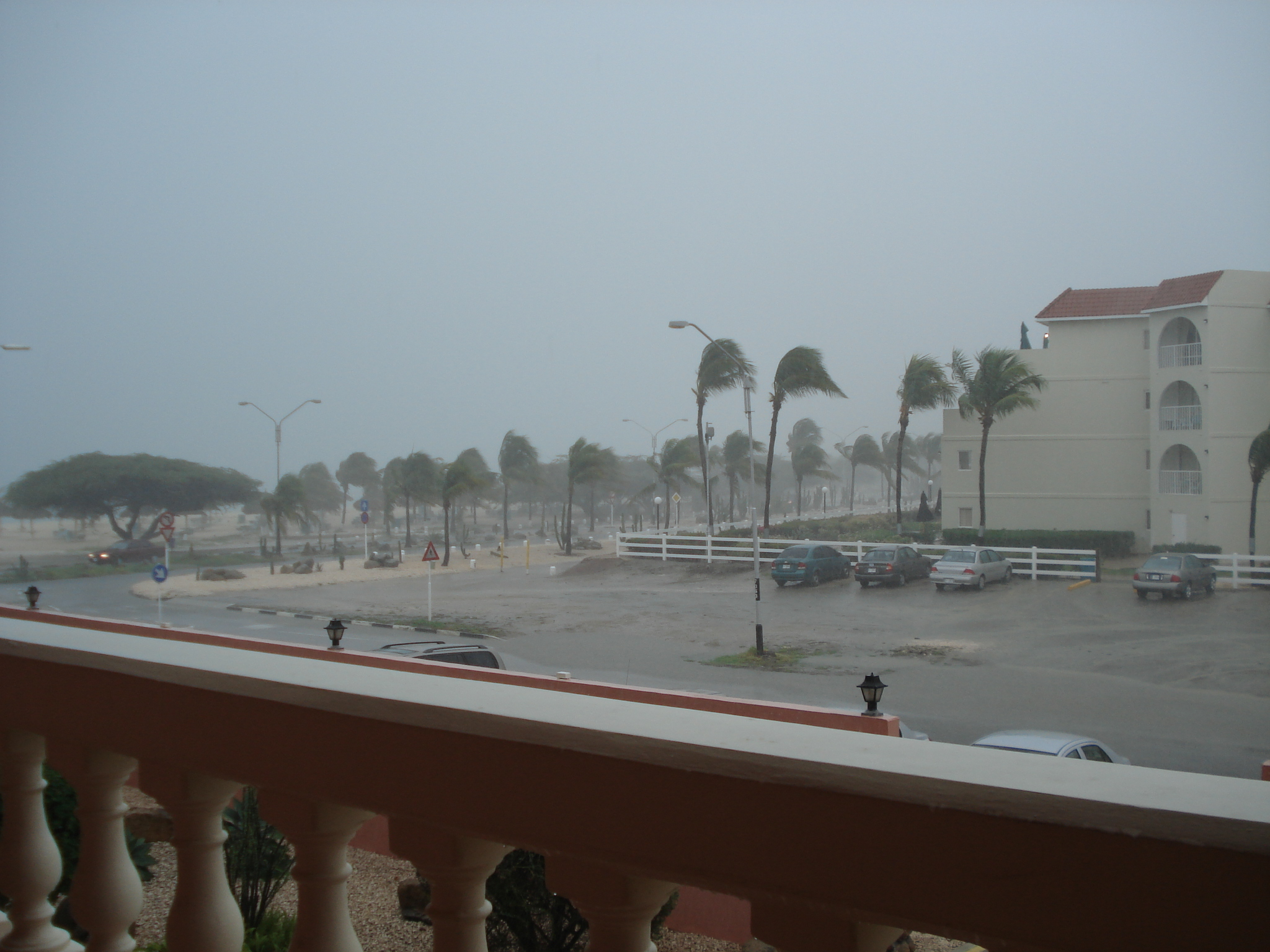
Felix passing Aruba

At around 1200 UTC on September 1 a wind gust of 46 mph (74 km/h) was recorded on Barbados, and around the same time a gust of 44 mph (71 km/h) was observed in Saint Vincent. The storm produced heavy rainfall across the Windward Islands. On Trinidad, heavy precipitation caused mudslides and overflown rivers which destroyed some bridges; moderate winds damaged several buildings on the island. Damage on neighboring Tobago was concentrated on its northern portion, where several mudslides resulted from the rainfall; monetary damage on Tobago was estimated at $250,000 (2007 TTD; $40,000 2007 USD, 62,109 2026 USD). Felix produced gusty winds on Grenada, which downed several power lines and destroyed the roofs of two houses; rough waves also broke several vessels from their anchors. In St. Lucia, winds from the storm damaged the roof of a store in Castries, which collapsed and destroyed 12 vehicles.

In the ABC islands, the hurricane resulted in gusty winds and heavy rainfall. However, little damage was reported in Bonaire; the precipitation left several homes submerged under water in Curaçao. In Aruba, the winds damaged one house and briefly left a northern town without power. Hurricane Felix produced strong winds and 10 ft (3.0 m) waves along the north coast of Venezuela, which left one person missing in Puerto Cabello.

=== Central America ===
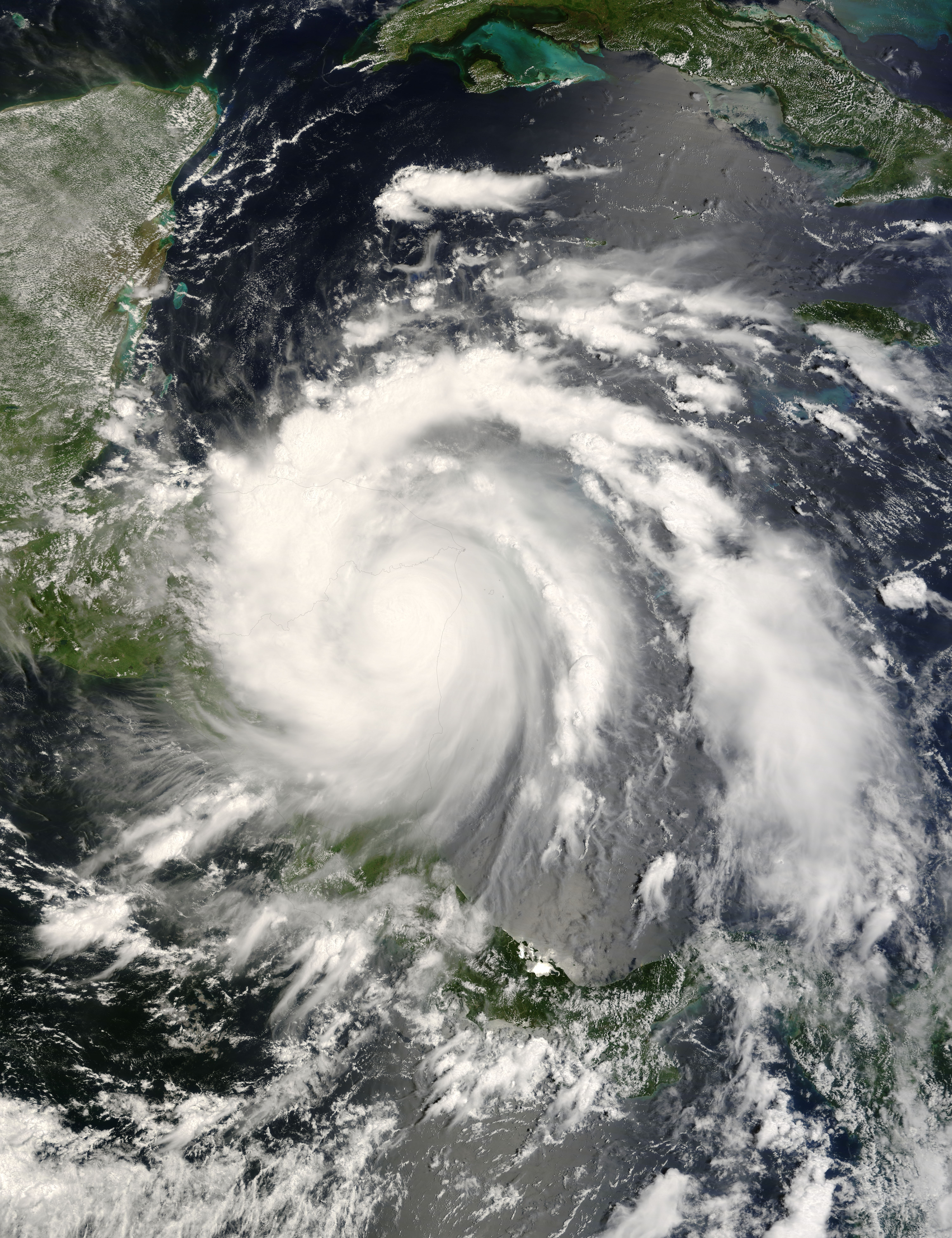
Hurricane Felix after its landfall in Nicaragua on September 4

Early reports suggest severe damage in Honduras and Nicaragua after Felix made landfall as a Category 5 hurricane. In Puerto Cabezas, nearly every structure sustained at least roof damage, and many buildings were destroyed. Along the Mosquito Coast, flooding and mudslides were reported, destroying many houses and blocking highways. The government of Nicaragua declared the northern Caribbean coast a disaster area. The Miskito Cays, located about 43 mi (69 km) from Puerto Cabezas on the northeast coast of Nicaragua, was among the strongest hit areas. Hurricane Felix had not yet made landfall but reached maximum force when it passed over the Miskito Cays. The winds of the hurricane, with speeds of up to 160 mph (260 km/h), destroyed the Cays completely. Pillars that previously formed the base of the houses were the only remains on the Cays.

At least 133 people were reported dead. At least 130 of them were in Nicaragua. While few details have been disclosed, they include at least 25 dead Miskito fishermen swept away, a drowning death on a boat, impact from a fallen tree and at least one indirect death caused by medical complications after birth. There were three deaths reported in Honduras, one of which was caused by a motor vehicle accident caused by heavy rain and landslides, and two caused by flooding in the capital city of Tegucigalpa. However, hundreds of others were missing (mostly at sea), and communication was difficult to impossible in many areas. Some survivors were also found on the Mosquito Coast who were initially reported missing.

According to official information, at least 40,000 people were affected and 9,000 houses destroyed, most of them in the Nicaraguan city of Puerto Cabezas, where a "State of Disaster" was decreed by the government. A total lack of supplies and services were also reported in the area. The response was almost immediate. Help from Venezuela, Cuba, the United States, and Honduras was received, and a lot of organizations, such as the Nicaraguan Red Cross, the media and universities organized collections all over the country. Nicaraguan President Daniel Ortega visited Puerto Cabezas on the day after the catastrophe and promised the reconstruction of houses to the people affected. Damage in Nicaragua totaled 13.4 billion (2007 NIO; $716.3 million 2007 USD, 1.11 billion 2026 USD).

Inland flooding was also reported in Honduras, particularly near Tegucigalpa and in the northwestern regions where the Ulua River and the Chamelecon River overflowed into an agricultural area. Coastal flooding also damages the town of Izabal in Guatemala where 850 people were evacuated. Crop damage in Honduras amounted to L68.28 million (2007 HNL; $3.64 million 2007 USD, 5.65 million 2026 USD).

== Aftermath ==
After Felix, over 160,000 people were suffering as many communities were stranded due to the storm. An appeal was given out by the United Nations for over $48 million (2007 USD, 74.5 million 2026 USD) in emergency aid to the hard-hit areas, particularly in Nicaragua. The appeal United States federal government delivered over $1.17 million (2007 USD, 1.82 million 2026 USD) in assistance, and the European Union responded with a donation of €1 million euros ($1.36 million 2007 USD, 2.11 million 2026 USD). The United States Agency for International Development (USAID) and the Office of Foreign Disaster Assistance (OFDA) airlifted 120 rolls of plastic sheeting to the severely affected areas, which was used to repair the damaged roofs of health clinics and schools. USAID and OFDA also distributed 12,000 ten-liter water containers to Puerto Cabezas. Emergency relief supplies from both USAID and OFDA totaled to $94,190 (2007 USD, 146,251 2026 USD). In the aftermath of both Hurricane Dean and Felix, combined, USAID and OFDA donated $25,000 (2007 USD, 38,818 2026 USD) in aid to Honduras, and $1.2 million (2007 USD, 1.86 million 2026 USD) to Nicaragua. In addition, United States Department of Defense (USDOD) gave $1.5 million (2007 USD, 2.33 million 2026 USD) in humanitarian assistance to Nicaragua. In collaboration with USAID and OFDA, the USDOD delivered near 27.55 tons (25 metric tons) of food from the United Nations' World Food Program to the North Caribbean Coast Autonomous Region, Nicaragua.

=== Retirement ===
Due to the extensive damage and high death toll from the hurricane in Nicaragua, the name Felix was retired by the World Meteorological Organization in May 2008, and it will never be used again for an Atlantic tropical cyclone. The name was replaced with Fernand for the 2013 season.

== See also ==
- Tropical cyclones in 2007
- List of Category 5 Atlantic hurricanes
- Timeline of the 2007 Atlantic hurricane season
- Hurricane Matthew (2016) – Similar storm and lowest latitude Category 5 Atlantic hurricane on record
- Hurricane Eta (2020) – A deadly Category 4 hurricane that impacted similar areas
- Hurricane Iota (2020) – A Category 4 hurricane that impacted similar areas
