= List of storms named Henriette =

The name Henriette has been used for nine tropical cyclones worldwide: eight in the Eastern Pacific Ocean, and one in the South-West Indian Ocean.

In the Eastern Pacific:

- Hurricane Henriette (1983) – Category 4 hurricane that remained offshore Mexico
- Tropical Storm Henriette (1989) – weak tropical storm that remained at sea
- Hurricane Henriette (1995) – Category 2 hurricane that briefly moved over the Baja California Peninsula, causing strong winds
- Tropical Storm Henriette (2001) – strong tropical storm that did not affect land
- Hurricane Henriette (2007) – Category 1 hurricane that caused heavy rainfall as it moved ashore western Mexico
- Hurricane Henriette (2013) – Category 2 hurricane, moved into the Central Pacific basin
- Tropical Storm Henriette (2019) – weak and short-lived tropical storm that remained at sea
- Hurricane Henriette (2025) – long-lived system that became a Category 1 hurricane in the Central Pacific basin

In the South-West Indian:

- Cyclone Henriette (1968) – a Category 2 tropical cyclone that passed just east of Rodrigues
