= Tropical Depression Ten (2007) =

Atlantic tropical cyclone

- Tropical Depression Ten near landfall on September 21

Meteorological history
- Formed: September 21, 2007
- Dissipated: September 22, 2007

Tropical depression
- 1-minute sustained (SSHWS/NWS)
- Highest winds: 35 mph (55 km/h)
- Lowest pressure: 1005 mbar (hPa); 29.68 inHg

Overall effects
- Fatalities: None reported
- Damage: $6.2 million (2007 USD)
- Areas affected: Florida, Georgia, Alabama
- IBTrACS
- Part of the 2007 Atlantic hurricane season

Tropical Depression Ten was a short-lived tropical cyclone that made landfall on the Florida Panhandle in September 2007. The system developed as a subtropical depression on September 21 in the northeastern Gulf of Mexico from the interaction of a tropical wave, the tail end of a cold front, and an upper-level low. Initially containing a poorly defined circulation and intermittent thunderstorm activity, the system transitioned into a tropical depression after convection increased over the center. Tracking northwestward, the depression moved ashore near Fort Walton Beach early on September 22 and dissipated over southeastern Alabama shortly thereafter.

Initially the depression was forecast to move ashore as a minimal tropical storm, and the threat of the depression prompted state of emergency declarations in Mississippi and Louisiana. It was the first tropical cyclone to threaten the New Orleans area since Hurricane Katrina and the destructive 2005 hurricane season. Overall impact from the cyclone was minor and largely limited to light rainfall. However, the precursor system spawned a damaging tornado in Eustis, Florida, where 20 houses were destroyed and 30 more were damaged.

== Meteorological history ==
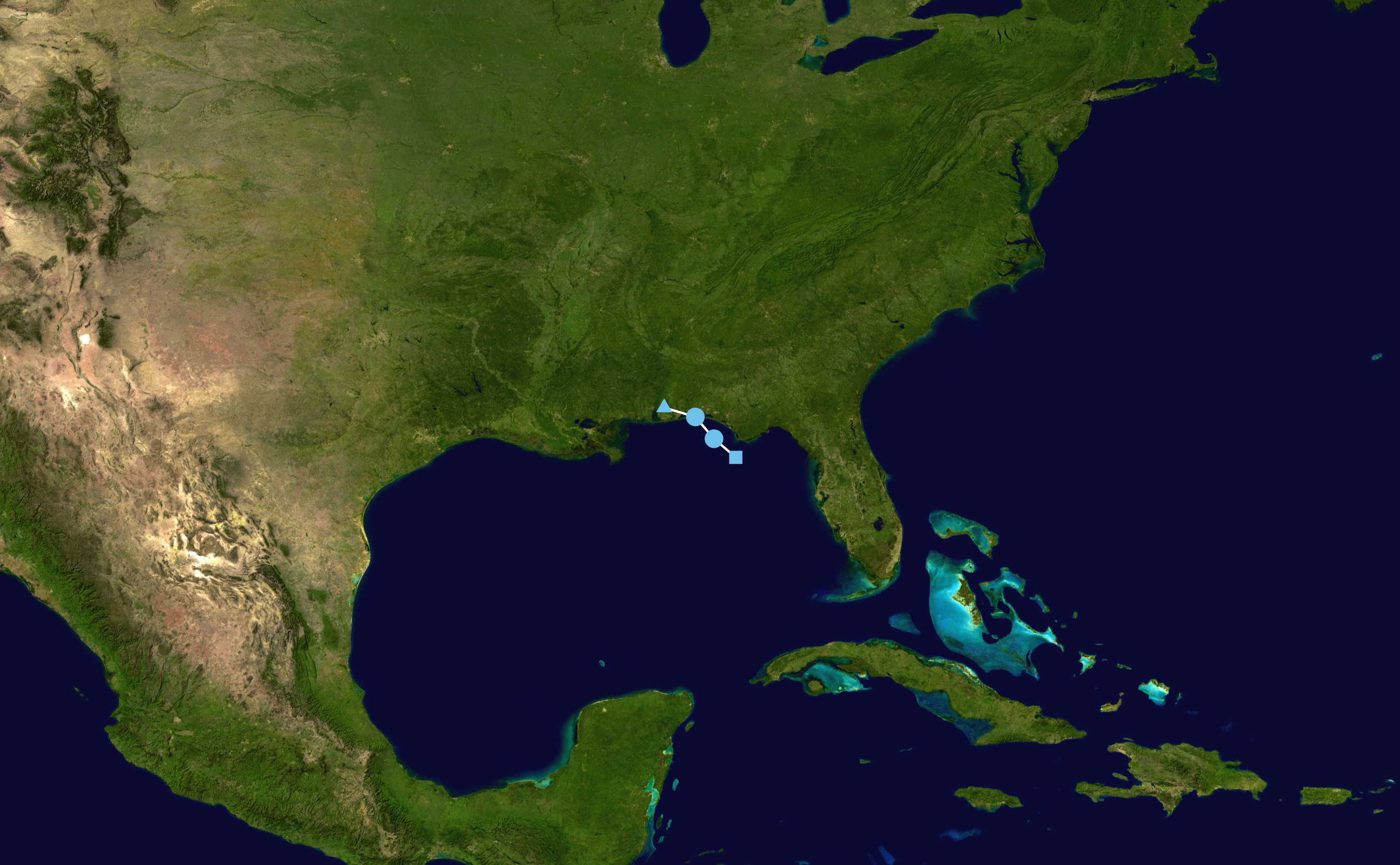
Map plotting the storm's track and intensity, according to the Saffir–Simpson scale Map key Saffir–Simpson scale Tropical depression (≤38 mph, ≤62 km/h) Tropical storm (39–73 mph, 63–118 km/h) Category 1 (74–95 mph, 119–153 km/h) Category 2 (96–110 mph, 154–177 km/h) Category 3 (111–129 mph, 178–208 km/h) Category 4 (130–156 mph, 209–251 km/h) Category 5 (≥157 mph, ≥252 km/h) Unknown Storm type Tropical cyclone Subtropical cyclone Extratropical cyclone, remnant low, tropical disturbance, or monsoon depression

Tropical Depression Ten formed from the complex interaction between an upper-level low, a tropical wave that produced Tropical Storm Ingrid, and the tail end of a cold front. By September 17, the system produced widespread thunderstorm activity over The Bahamas and western Atlantic Ocean. The upper-level low over the Florida Panhandle increased convection across the area, and on September 18 the system began crossing Florida. Initially very disorganized, surface pressures gradually decreased across the region, with a weak low-pressure area developing on September 19.

A reconnaissance aircraft flight into the system on September 20 reported a well-defined low and strong wind gusts in squalls as the system tracked into the northeastern Gulf of Mexico, along with limited and disorganized thunderstorm activity. Convection gradually became better organized, with a well-defined band in its eastern semicircle and intermittent thunderstorm activity near the center. Despite an overall disorganized structure, with a poorly defined circulation and an upper-level low aloft, the National Hurricane Center initiated advisories on Subtropical Depression Ten at 1500 UTC on September 21 while it was located about 40 miles (64 km) south of St. Vincent Island, Florida, citing "the potential for additional development right along the coastline." In post-analysis, it was classified a subtropical cyclone three hours earlier.

With a mid-level ridge to its northwest, the subtropical depression was anticipated to parallel the coastline of the Gulf Coast of the United States. As a result, it was forecast to attain winds of 45 mph (72 km/h) and move ashore along southern Mississippi. The circulation became better defined as convection modestly increased over the center, and within six hours of its development the system transitioned into a tropical depression. The cyclone continued tracking northwestward, making landfall around 0000 UTC on September 22 near Fort Walton Beach, Florida, with winds of 35 mph (56 km/h). The cloud pattern deteriorated as it tracked inland, and 3 hours after it moved ashore the National Hurricane Center issued its last advisory on the depression. As the depression tracked into Alabama, it became increasingly disorganized, and the system would dissipate early on September 22. Its remnant surface low continued west-northwest before dissipating near the Louisiana/Texas border early on September 23.

== Preparations and impact ==
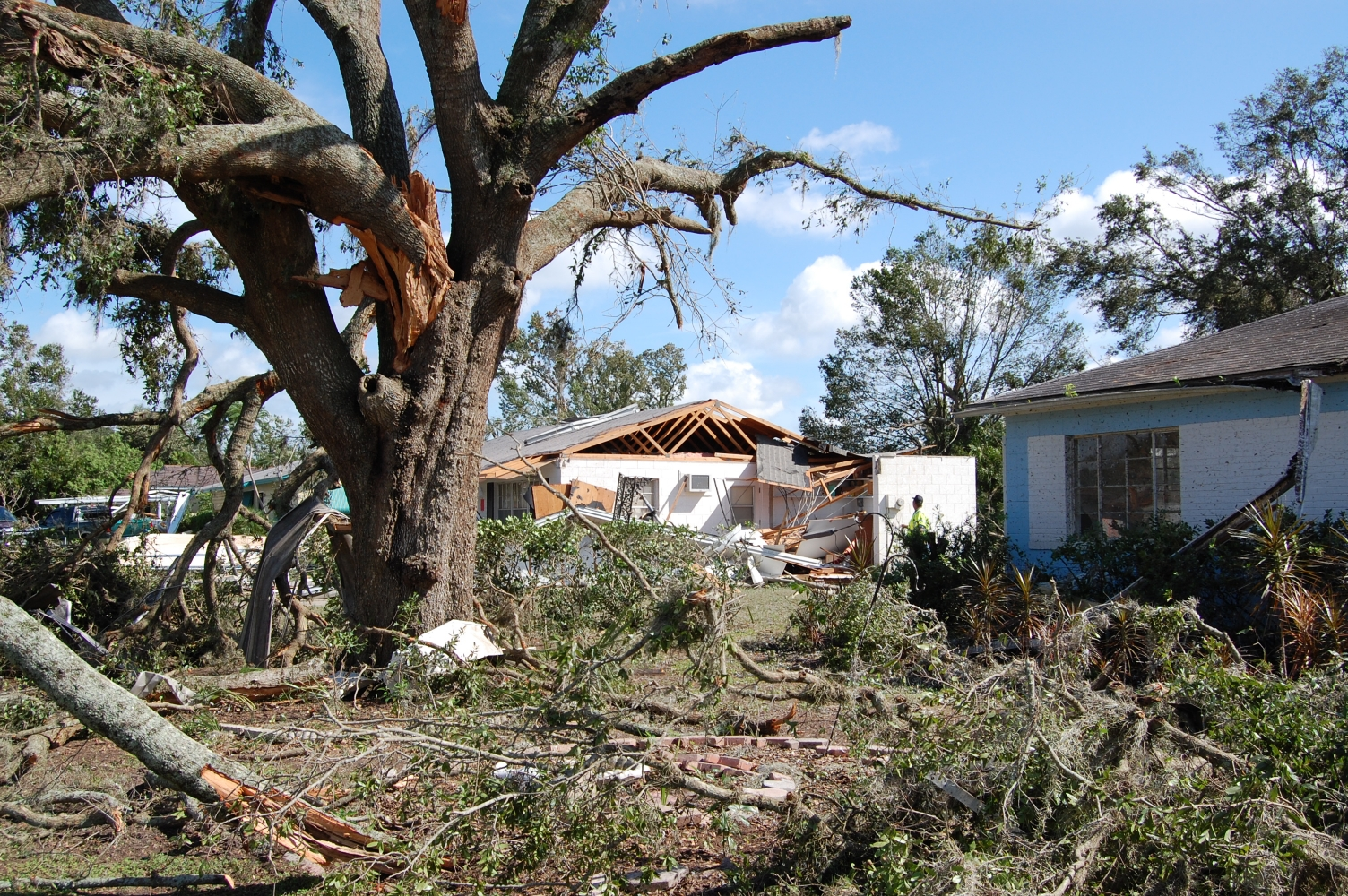
Tornado damage in Eustis, Florida

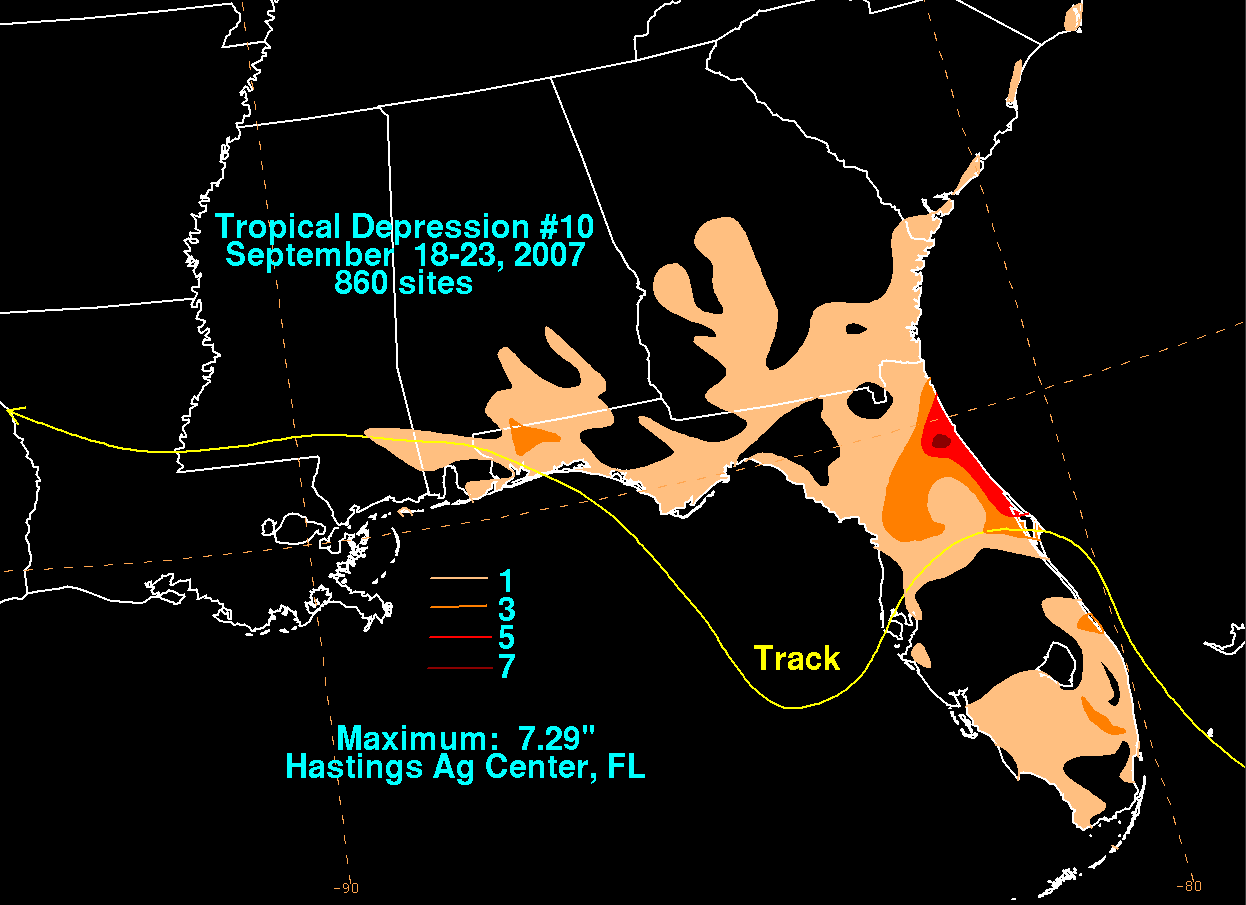
Total rainfall from the depression

The combination of wind shear and low-level helicity produced moderate convection across central Florida in association with the precursor low pressure system. Late on September 20, a supercell developed near Lake Apopka, and tracking quickly northward it spawned an EF1 tornado near Eustis; the tornado tracked for 1.83 mi (2.95 km) and reached winds of about 100 mph (160 km/h). The tornado destroyed 20 homes, left 30 others severely damaged, injured one person, and caused power outages for about 300 people. Damage totaled $6.2 million (2007 USD). Tornadoes were also reported near Marianna and Chipley. The precursor low pressure system also generated lightning that struck and killed a man in Hendry County, Florida.

Outer rainbands began affecting coastal sections of the Florida Panhandle by about 12 hours prior to the formation of the depression. Coinciding with the first advisory on the depression, the National Hurricane Center issued a tropical storm warning from Apalachicola, Florida, westward to the mouth of the Mississippi River. Shortly thereafter, an inland tropical storm warning was issued for Pearl River, Walthall, and Pike counties in Mississippi and Washington Parish in Louisiana. Additionally, the New Orleans National Weather Service issued a coastal flood watch for four parishes in southeastern Louisiana. In Mississippi, Governor Haley Barbour declared a state of emergency. Officials ordered a mandatory evacuation for residents in shallow areas and in mobile homes for Jackson, Harrison, and Hancock counties. Officials in New Orleans opened three emergency shelters, citing the potential need of shelter for citizens in about 17,000 FEMA trailers after Hurricane Katrina. Due to the threat of the cyclone, Louisiana governor Kathleen Blanco declared a state of emergency and placed the state's National Guard and other disaster services on reserve.

Waves of about 5 ft (1.5 m) and rip currents were reported along the west coast of Florida. However, no beach erosion was reported. Rainfall associated with the system peaked at 7.29 in (185 mm) at Hastings. Elsewhere, rainfall totals reached 1.46 in (37 mm) in Albany, Georgia, and 0.51 in (13 mm) in Dothan, Alabama. Wind gusts from the storm peaked at 46 mph (74 km/h) in Milton, Florida, which blew down a few trees in Escambia County. Overall damage from the depression was minimal. Storm surge ranged from 2.5 to 4.1 feet (0.76 to 1.25 m) along the Panhandle.

Prior to the storm's development, several oil and gas companies removed unneeded workers from offshore oil platforms in the northern Gulf of Mexico; Shell Oil Company evacuated about 700 employees, while Noble Energy removed its workforce of about 300 people from two oil rigs. ExxonMobil cut its output by about 1,000 barrels of oil and 55,000 cubic feet (1,600 m^{3}). With 27.7% of the daily crude oil production halted due to the depression, oil prices rose further after days of increasing levels, and on September 20 reached a record rate of over $84 per barrel.

=== Tornadoes ===
List of confirmed tornadoes (Note: All dates are based on the local time zone where the tornado touched down; however, all times are in Coordinated Universal Time for consistency.)
EF#	Location	County / Parish	State	Start Coord.	Date	Time (UTC)	Path length	Max width	Damage (Note: All damage totals are in 2007 USD unless otherwise stated.)	Summary	Refs
EF1	Eustis area	Lake	FL	28.84°N 81.68°W	September 20	0257 – 0305	1.83 mi (2.95 km)	100 yd (91 m)	$6,200,000	Seven homes were destroyed, 27 homes sustained major damage, and 81 homes reported minor damage.	
EF1	W of Mayo	Lafayette	FL	30.05°N 83.25°W	September 20	0420 – 0421	0.25 mi (0.40 km)	35 yd (32 m)	$2,000	Large oak trees were uprooted.	
EF0	SE of Clio	Barbour	AL	31.66°N 85.57°W	September 21	2234 – 2235	0.36 mi (0.58 km)	20 yd (18 m)	—N/a	Tornado reported by a Sheriff's deputy; no damage.	
EF0	Jerome area	Collier	FL	26.00°N 81.40°W	September 22	0100 – 0105	0.5 mi (0.80 km)	20 yd (18 m)	—N/a	Several motorists reported a tornado touchdown; no reported damage.	

== See also ==
- List of Florida hurricanes (2000–present)
- Timeline of the 2007 Atlantic hurricane season
