= Barquillo =

Spanish biscuit snack

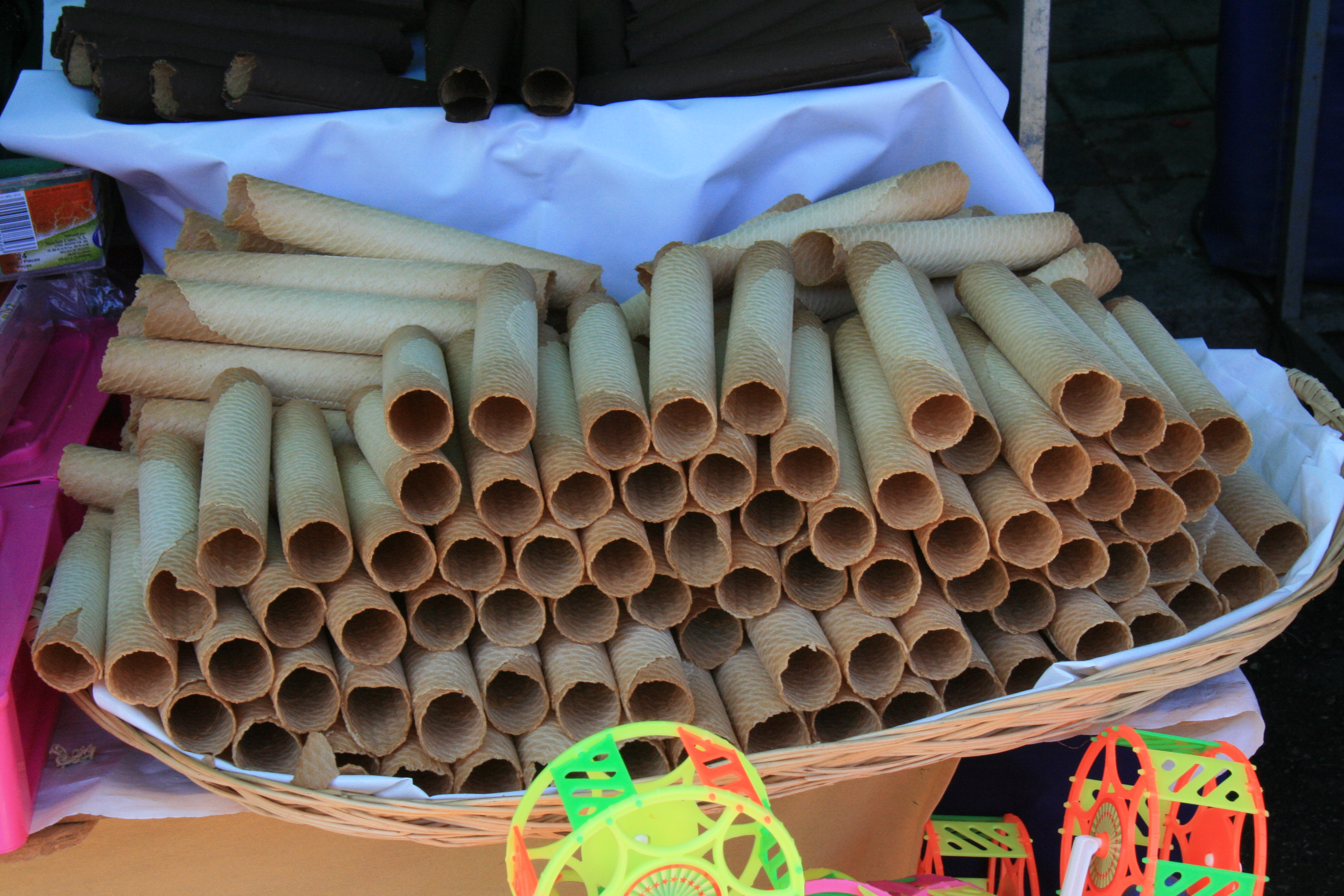
- Barquillos being sold in the fiesta of San Isidro Labrador in Madrid
- Alternative names: Biscuit roll, crispy biscuit roll, crisp biscuit roll, cookie roll, love letter
- Type: Biscuit
- Place of origin: Spain
- Variations: Barquiron, Cuchuflí

Barquillo is a crispy rolled wafer pastry originating in Spain. It is made from the basic cookie ingredients of flour, sugar, egg whites and butter rolled out thinly and then shaped into a hollow cylinder or a cone. It was traditionally sold by roadside vendors known as barquilleros who carried a characteristic red roulette tin (the ruleta de barquillero). It was introduced to Latin America and the Philippines during colonial times. In Spain and former Spanish colonies, barquillos are commonly regarded as a type of Christmas cookie. It is also popular during various fiestas. It spread to neighboring countries and today is extremely popular in East and Southeast Asia countries.

== Names ==
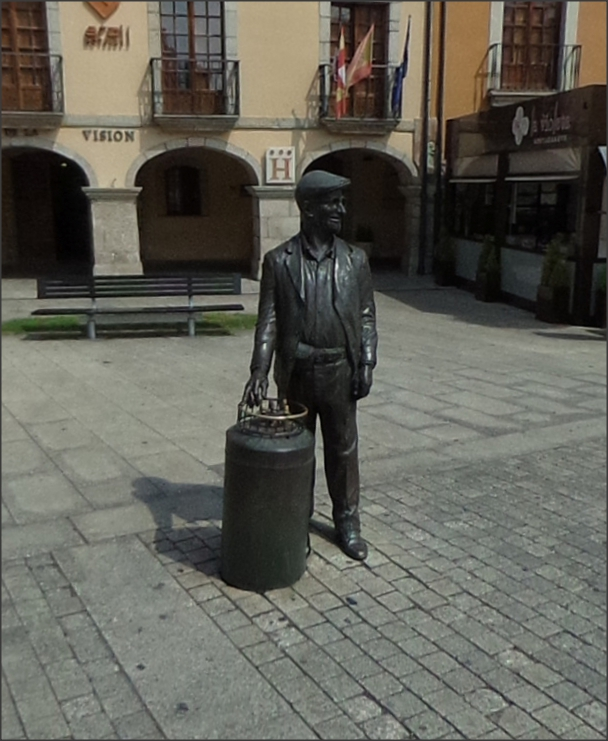
A monument to Pepe Cortés, a barquillero in Ponferrada, Spain

The Spanish name barquillo means "little boat". It is derived from the ancient tradition of heating the biscuits in convex or boat-shaped molds. Barquillos are also known by a variety of names. In English it is also known as biscuit roll, cookie roll, crispy biscuit roll, egg roll, crisp biscuit roll, or love letter. The Chinese name for this snack, "蛋卷", can be directly translated into English as "egg roll". However, the food item known in the West as egg roll is very different.

== Description ==
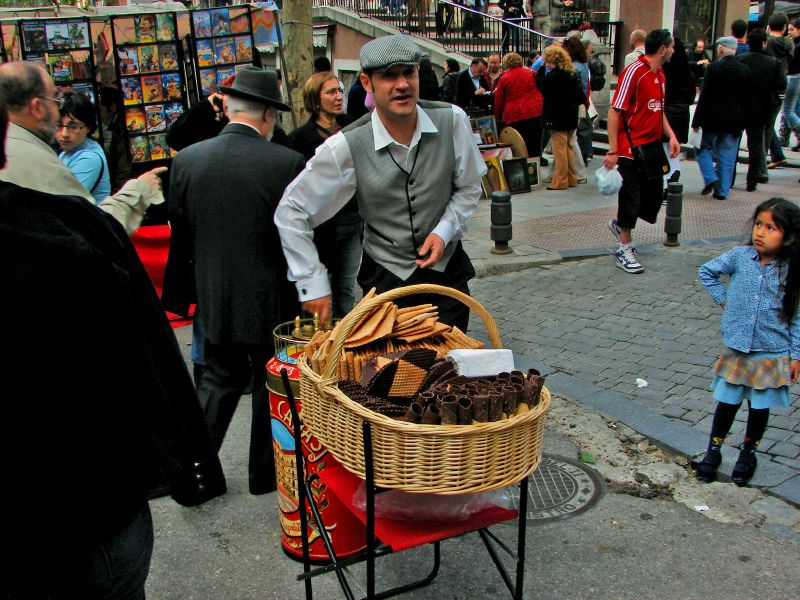
Vendor of barquillos in Madrid. Note the ruleta beside him.

Barquillos are thin wafers made from flour, sugar, egg whites and butter that is rolled into the shape of a long hollow tube or a cone. They can also be sold simply folded over twice in a fan shape. In Spain, it was traditionally sold by roaming roadside vendors known as "barquilleros" (or "barquilleras") during festive events. In Madrid, barquilleros are particularly associated with the fiesta of San Isidro Labrador, where the vendors typically dress in castizo (chulapo) attire.

Barquilleros carry a characteristic red tin known as the ruleta de barquillero which has a roulette spinner at the top. Buying barquillos typically involve a small game, where the buyer pays to spin the roulette. Depending on where the ticker lands, the buyer can either have one or two barquillos for the same price. The buyer can also pay a slightly larger amount to continue spinning the roulette and getting barquillos until it lands on one of the four golden markers.

The tradition of barquilleros almost became extinct during the dictatorship of Francisco Franco. Today, barquillos are most popular in Asia which has a larger population than Spain.

Barquillos are traditionally eaten plain. Modern versions, however, can flavor it with ingredients including vanilla, cinnamon, grated coconut, and lemon juice. Barquillos are also commonly dipped or coated in milk chocolate or have a chocolate center. Due to their similarity to ice cream cones, they are also commonly sold as containers for frozen treats.

Similar recipes to barquillos also exist in other countries in Europe, like the parizske pecivo of Czechoslovakia, the pirouettes of France, and krumkake of Norway. Flat versions are known as Rurki in Poland, goro in Norway, and pizzelle in Italy, among others.

== By region ==
=== Latin America ===
In Argentina and Chile, cylindrical barquillos filled with dulce de leche, chocolate, or other sweet fillings are known as cuchuflís (Chile) or cubanitos (Argentina).

=== Asia ===
Barquillos in the Philippines lack the grid-pattern of traditional Spanish barquillos. They are thinner and are usually rolled into elongated cylindrical shapes. Philippine barquillos are most strongly associated with the city of Iloilo, particularly to the Deocampo bakery in the district of Jaro, which has been commercially mass-producing barquillos since 1896.

A notable variant of barquillo is the Filipino barquiron (also spelled barqueron), which are barquillos filled with polvorón and crushed peanuts, cashew nuts, or pili nuts. It originates from the city of Iloilo. Other variants of Philippine barquillos include those flavored with ube, pandan leaves, and carrots, which are bright purple, green, and orange in color, respectively.

In Hong Kong, biscuit rolls are made of wheat flour, butter, egg, sugar, and vanilla flavour.

== Gallery ==
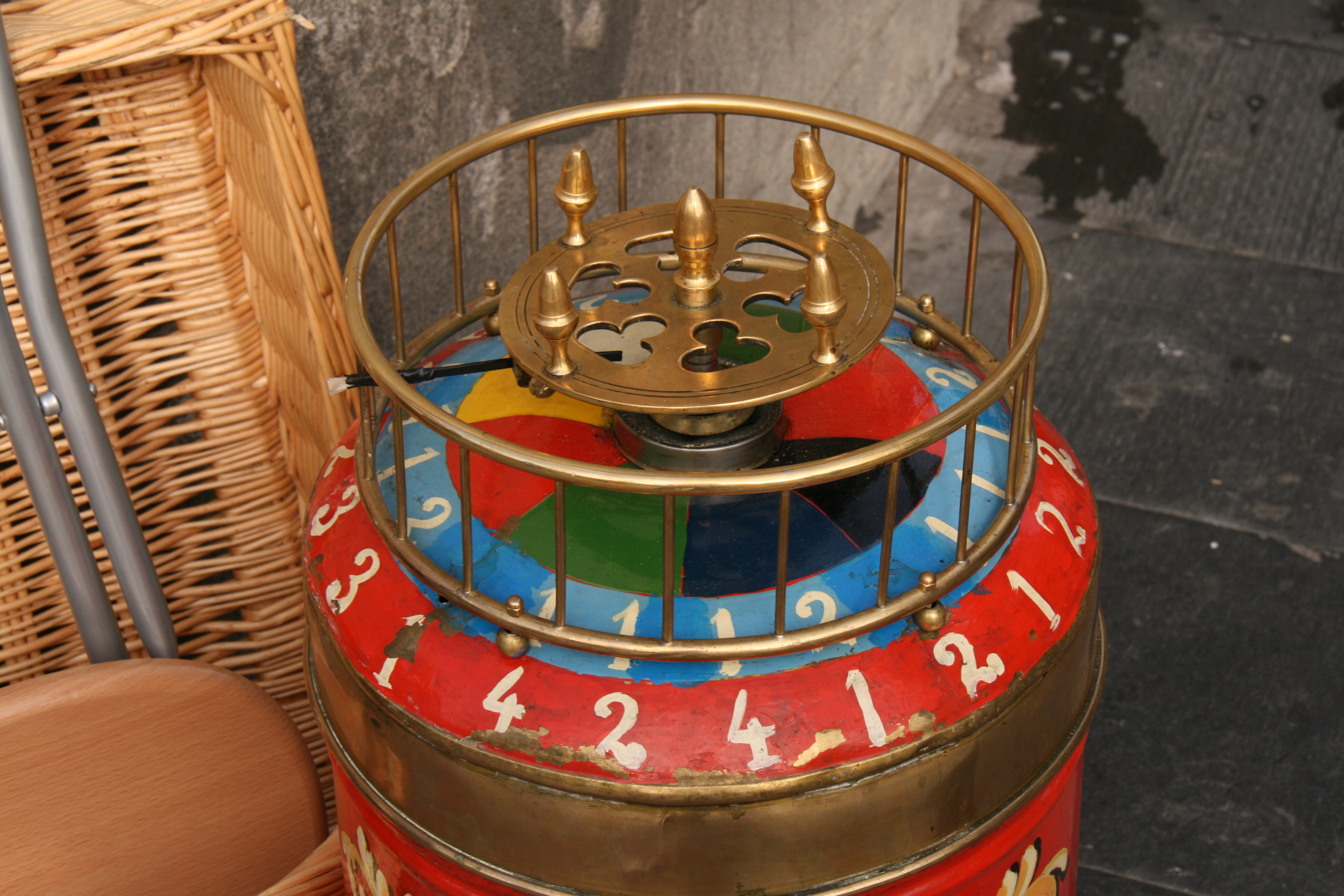
A ruleta de barquillero from Madrid

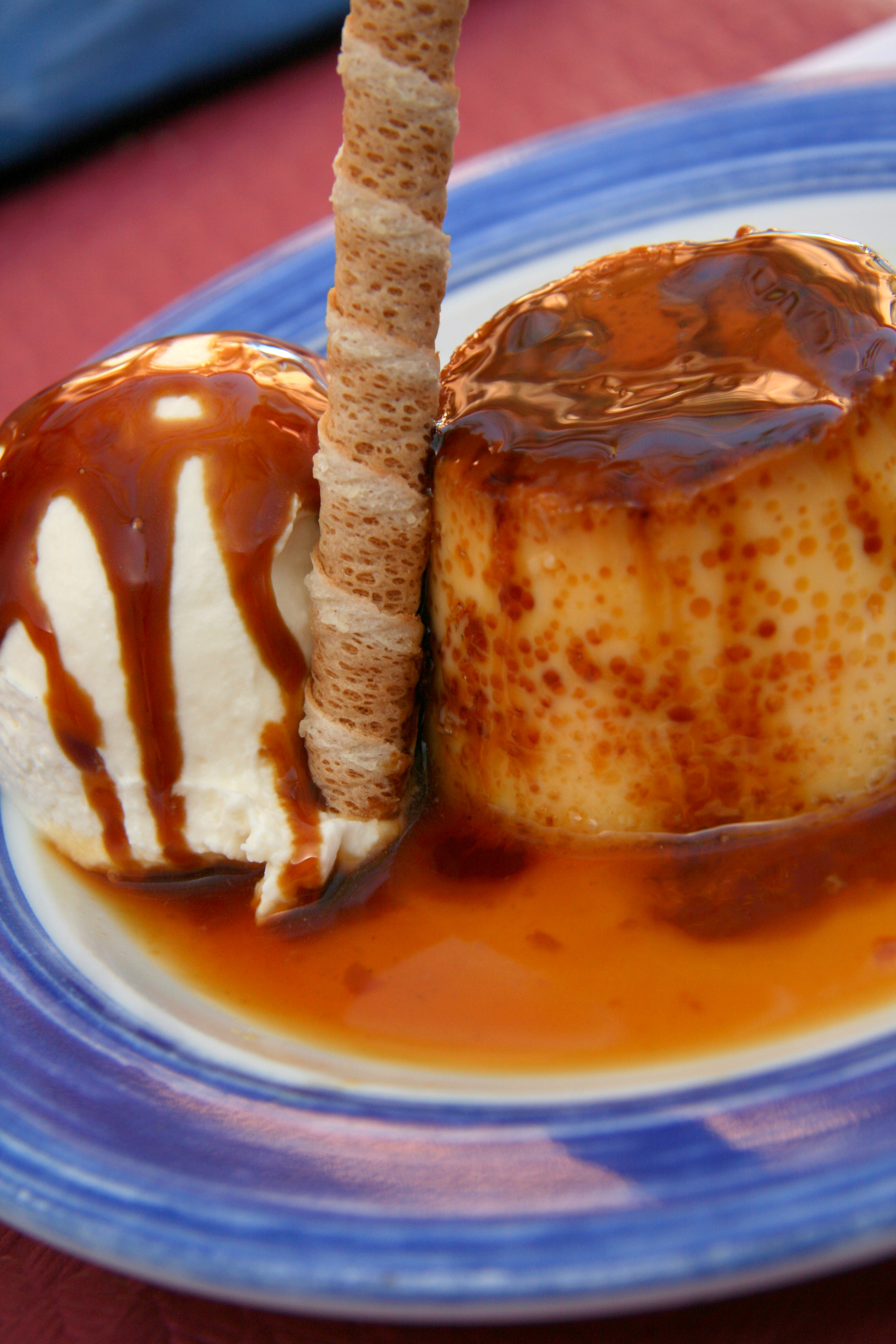
Flan con helado, a Spanish dessert with a barquillo

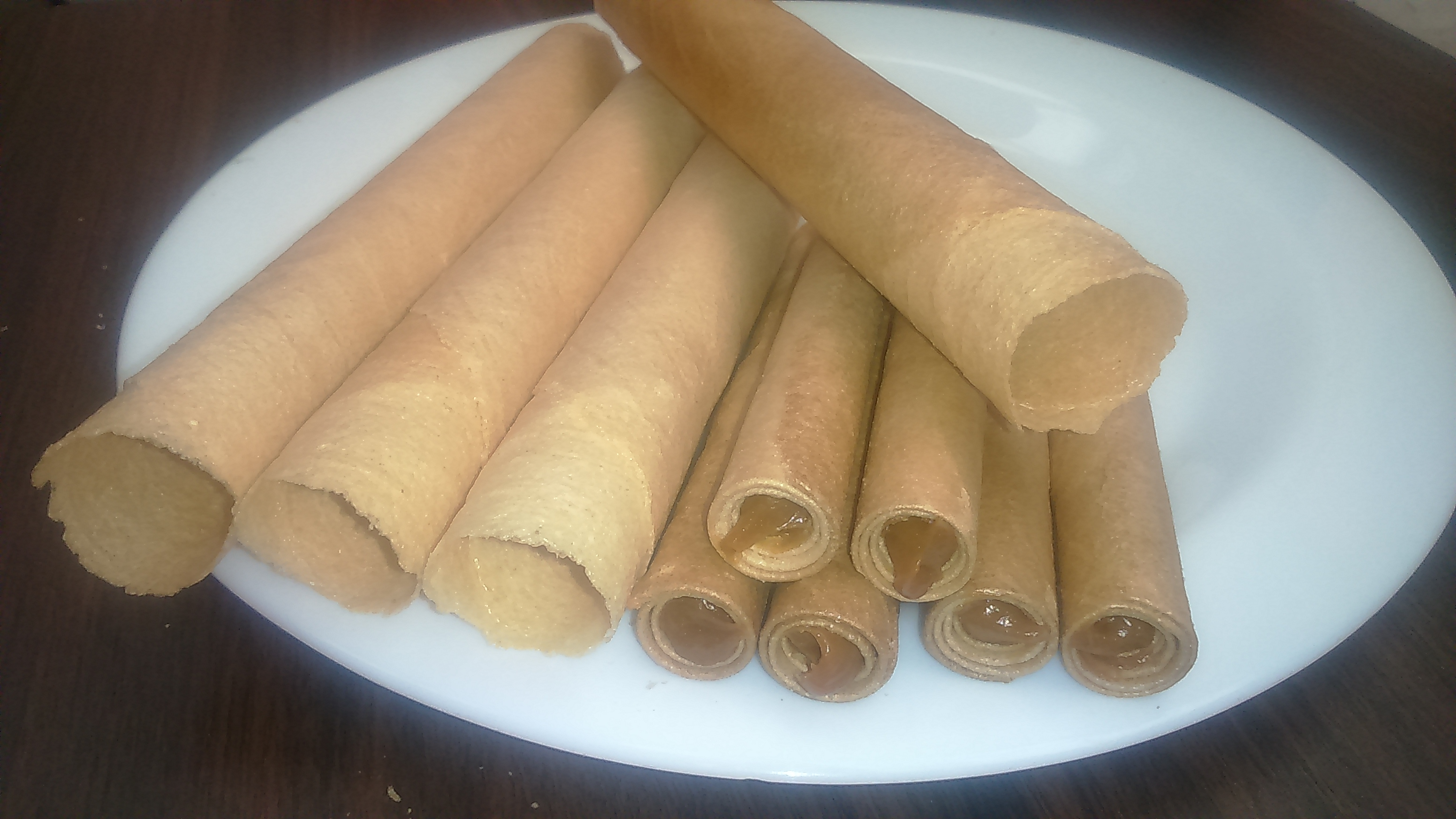
Barquillos and cuchuflís from Chile

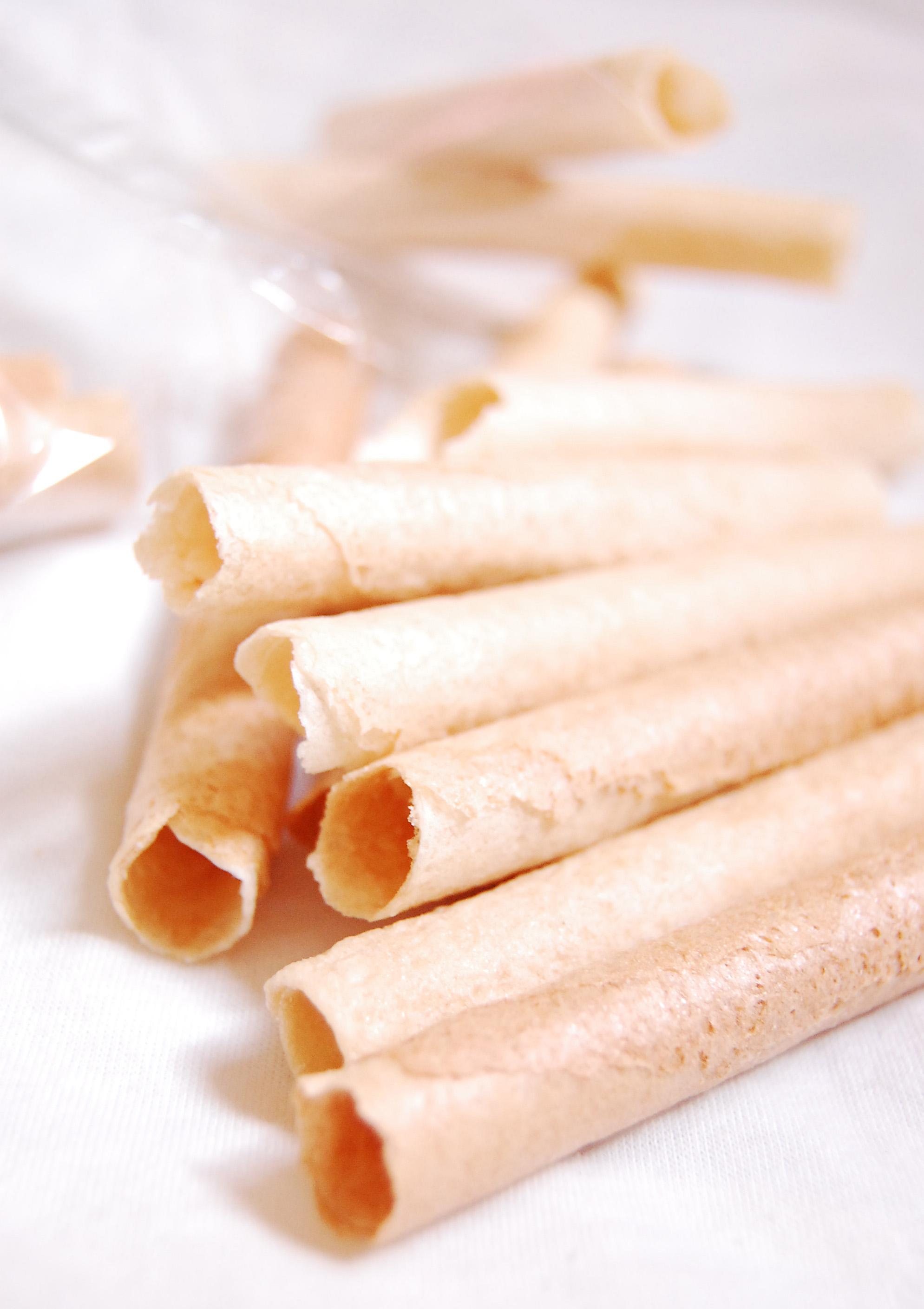
Filipino barquillos

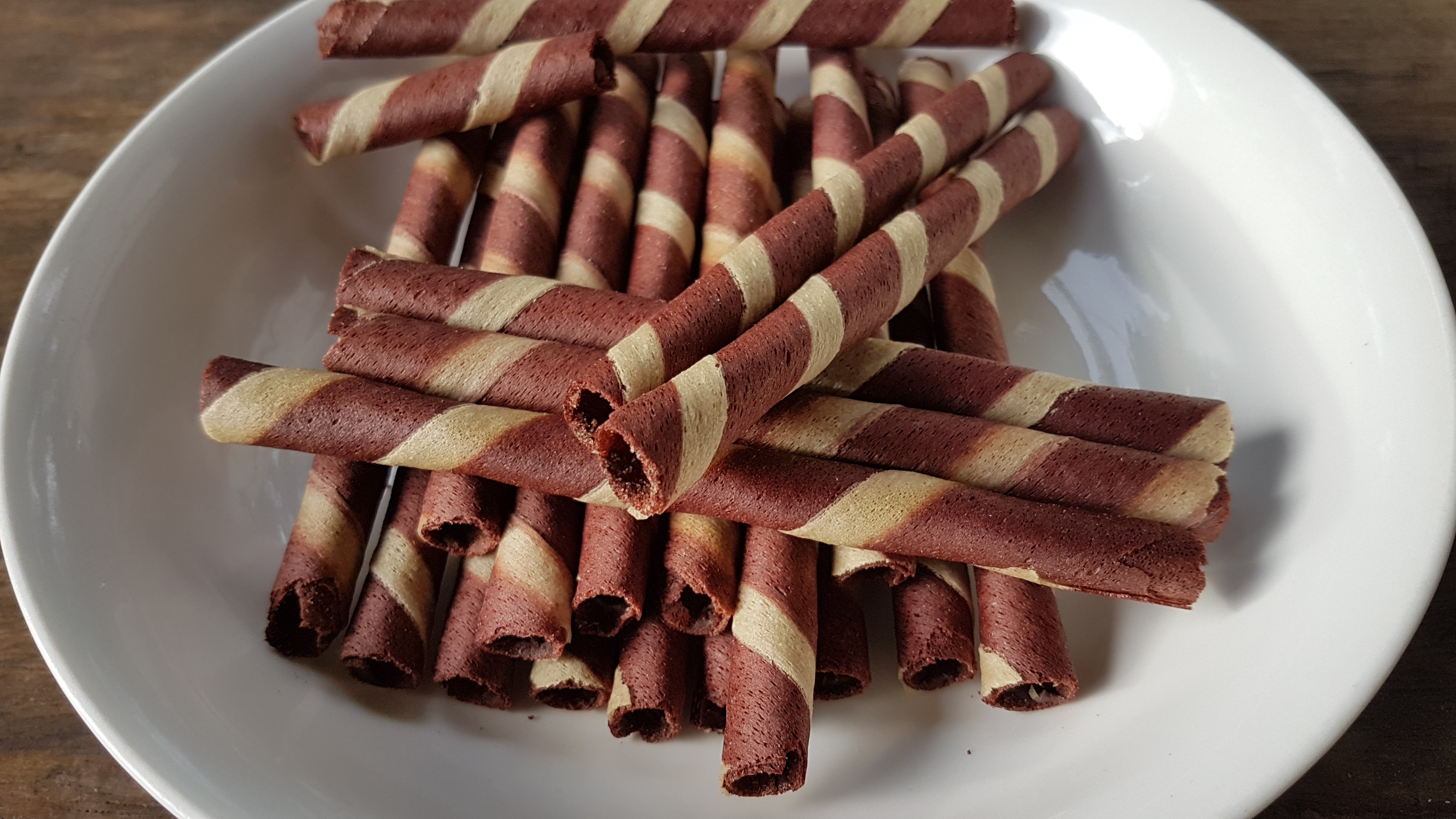
Filipino chocolate-filled barquillos

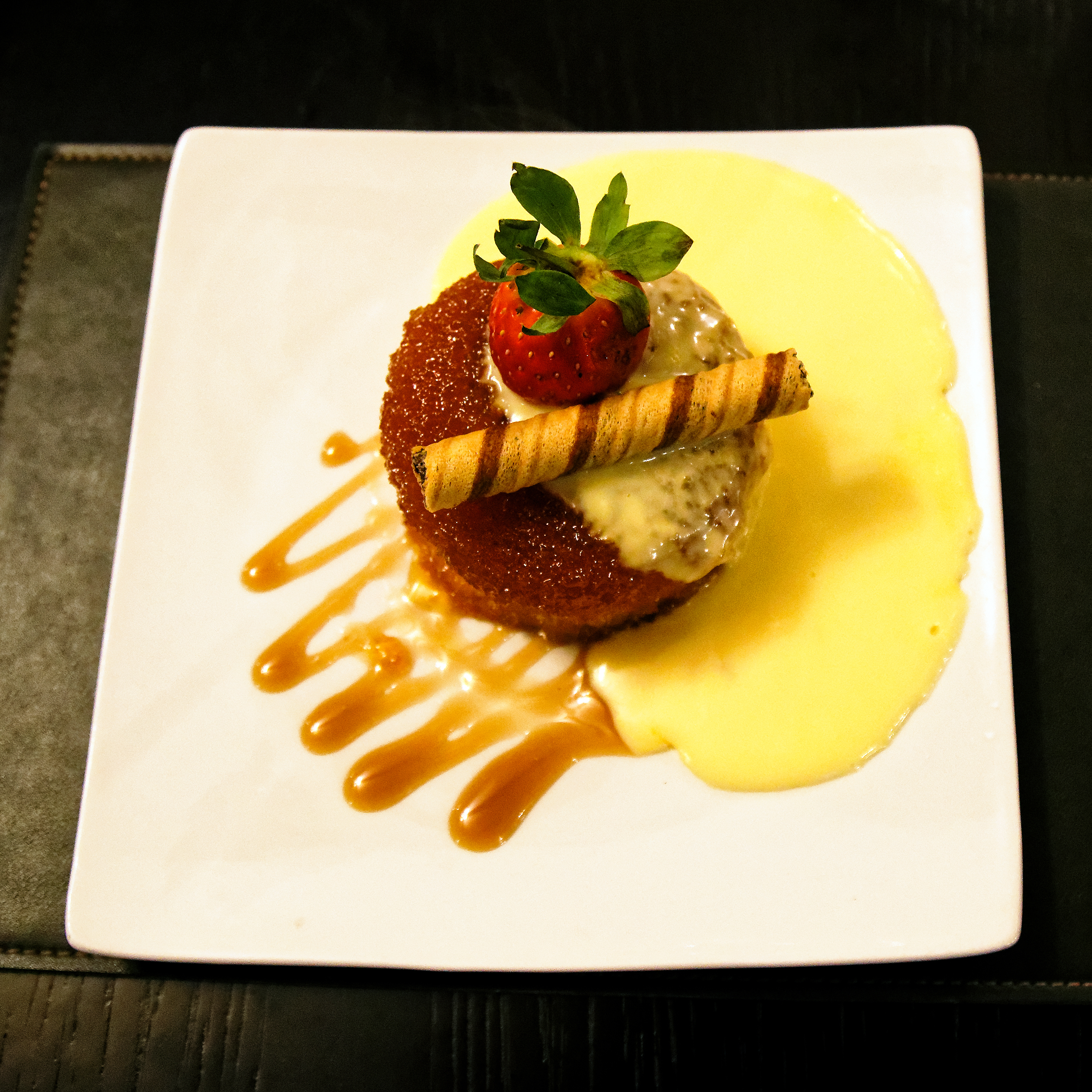
A syrup sponge pudding dessert with a biscuit roll from England

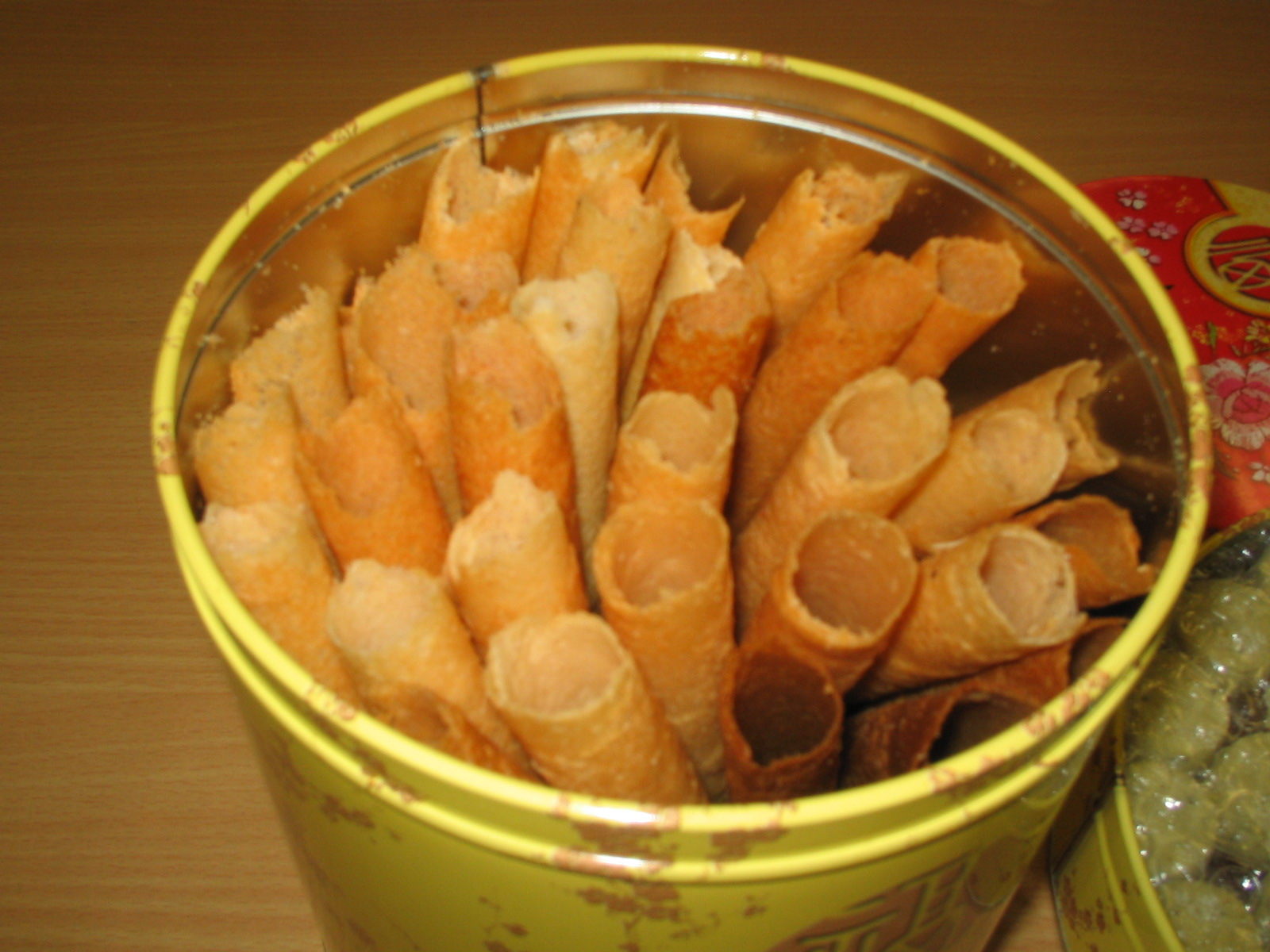
Hong Kong barquillos are commonly sold in tin cans

== See also ==
- Cucurucho
- Pirouline
- Pizzele
- Waffle
- Semprong
- Fortune cookie
