= El Yunque =

El Yunque may refer to:

== Geography ==
- El Yunque (Cuba), a tabletop-shaped mountain in Cuba
- El Yunque National Forest, a rainforest in eastern Puerto Rico (formerly, Caribbean National Forest)
  - El Yunque (Puerto Rico), the second-tallest mountain within El Yunque National Forest

== Organizations ==
- El Yunque (organization), Mexican political organization
