= Baracoa =

- Municipality
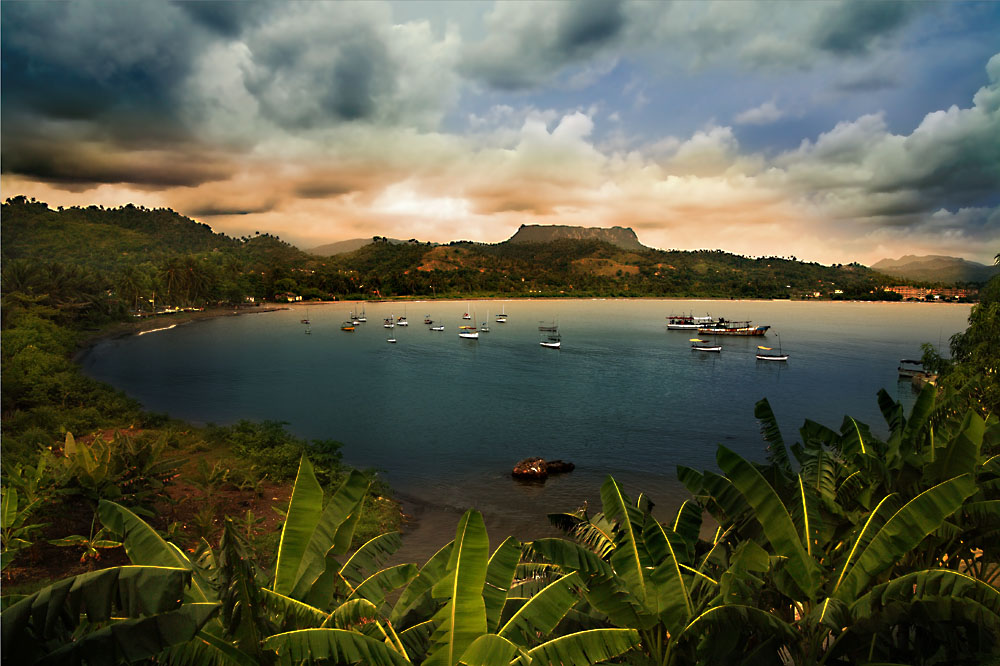
- A view of Baracoa across the bay

- Coat of arms

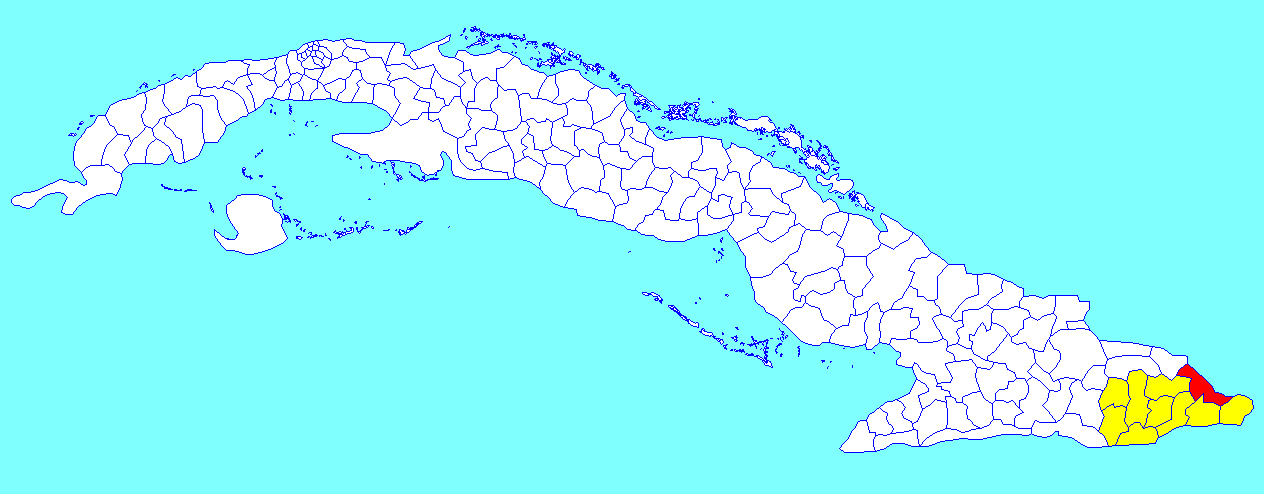
- Baracoa municipality (red) within Guantánamo Province (yellow) and Cuba
- Coordinates: 20°20′55″N 74°30′38″W
- Country: Cuba
- Province: Guantánamo
- Established: 1511

Area
  - Total: 977 km^{2} (377 sq mi)
- Elevation: 5 m (16 ft)

Population (2022)
  - Total: 78,056
  - Density: 79.9/km^{2} (207/sq mi)
- Time zone: UTC−5 (EST)
- Area code: +53-21
- Website: Official website

Baracoa, whose full original name is Nuestra Señora de la Asunción de Baracoa ('Our Lady of the Assumption of Baracoa'), is a municipality and city in Guantánamo Province near the eastern tip of Cuba. The area was visited by Admiral Christopher Columbus on November 27, 1492, and a settlement founded by the first governor of Cuba, the Spanish conquistador Diego Velázquez de Cuéllar on August 15, 1511. It is the oldest Spanish settlement in Cuba and was its first capital (the basis for its nickname Ciudad Primada, 'First City').

== Geography ==
Baracoa is located on the spot where Christopher Columbus landed in Cuba on his first voyage. It is thought that the name stems from the Indigenous Taíno language word meaning "the presence of the sea".

Baracoa lies on the Bay of Honey (Bahía de Miel) and is surrounded by a wide mountain range (including the Sierra del Purial), which causes it to be quite isolated, apart from a single mountain road built in the 1960s. The Baracoa mountain range is covered with Cuban moist forests and Cuban pine forests.

The municipality includes the villages of Barigua, Boca de Yumurí, Cabacú, Cayogüín, Jamal, Jaragua, Los Hoyos, Mabujabo, Mosquitero, Nibujón, Paso Cuba, Sabanilla, Santa María, Vega de Taco, and other minor localities.

Baracoa has a tropical rainforest climate (Af) according to the Köppen climate classification with high temperatures and rainfall throughout the year. Although there are no true wet or dry seasons, there is a noticeably wetter stretch from October to December.

Climate data for Baracoa
Month	Jan	Feb	Mar	Apr	May	Jun	Jul	Aug	Sep	Oct	Nov	Dec	Year
Mean daily maximum °C (°F)	28.3 (82.9)	27.5 (81.5)	28.6 (83.5)	29.7 (85.5)	30.5 (86.9)	31.6 (88.9)	31.8 (89.2)	32.2 (90.0)	31.9 (89.4)	31.1 (88.0)	29.2 (84.6)	28.1 (82.6)	30.0 (86.1)
Daily mean °C (°F)	24.2 (75.6)	23.3 (73.9)	24.2 (75.6)	25.5 (77.9)	26.4 (79.5)	27.3 (81.1)	27.7 (81.9)	27.9 (82.2)	27.5 (81.5)	26.8 (80.2)	25.3 (77.5)	24.3 (75.7)	25.9 (78.6)
Mean daily minimum °C (°F)	20.2 (68.4)	19.2 (66.6)	19.9 (67.8)	21.3 (70.3)	22.4 (72.3)	23.1 (73.6)	23.6 (74.5)	23.7 (74.7)	23.2 (73.8)	22.5 (72.5)	21.5 (70.7)	20.5 (68.9)	21.8 (71.2)
Average rainfall mm (inches)	218 (8.6)	143 (5.6)	141 (5.6)	147 (5.8)	284 (11.2)	168 (6.6)	186 (7.3)	196 (7.7)	186 (7.3)	356 (14.0)	334 (13.1)	342 (13.5)	2,701 (106.3)
Source: Climate-Data.org

== History ==
The original inhabitants of the island were Indigenous peoples, including the Guanahatabey, Ciboney, and Taíno. They were almost eradicated by European diseases throughout the island. A local hero is Hatuey, who fled from the Spanish in Hispaniola and raised an Indigenous army to fight the Spanish in Cuba. According to the story Hatuey was betrayed by a member of his group and sentenced to burn at the stake. It is said that just before he died a Catholic priest tried to convert him so he would attain salvation; Hatuey asked the priest if Heaven was the place where the dead Spanish go. When he received an answer in the affirmative he told the priest that he would rather go to Hell.

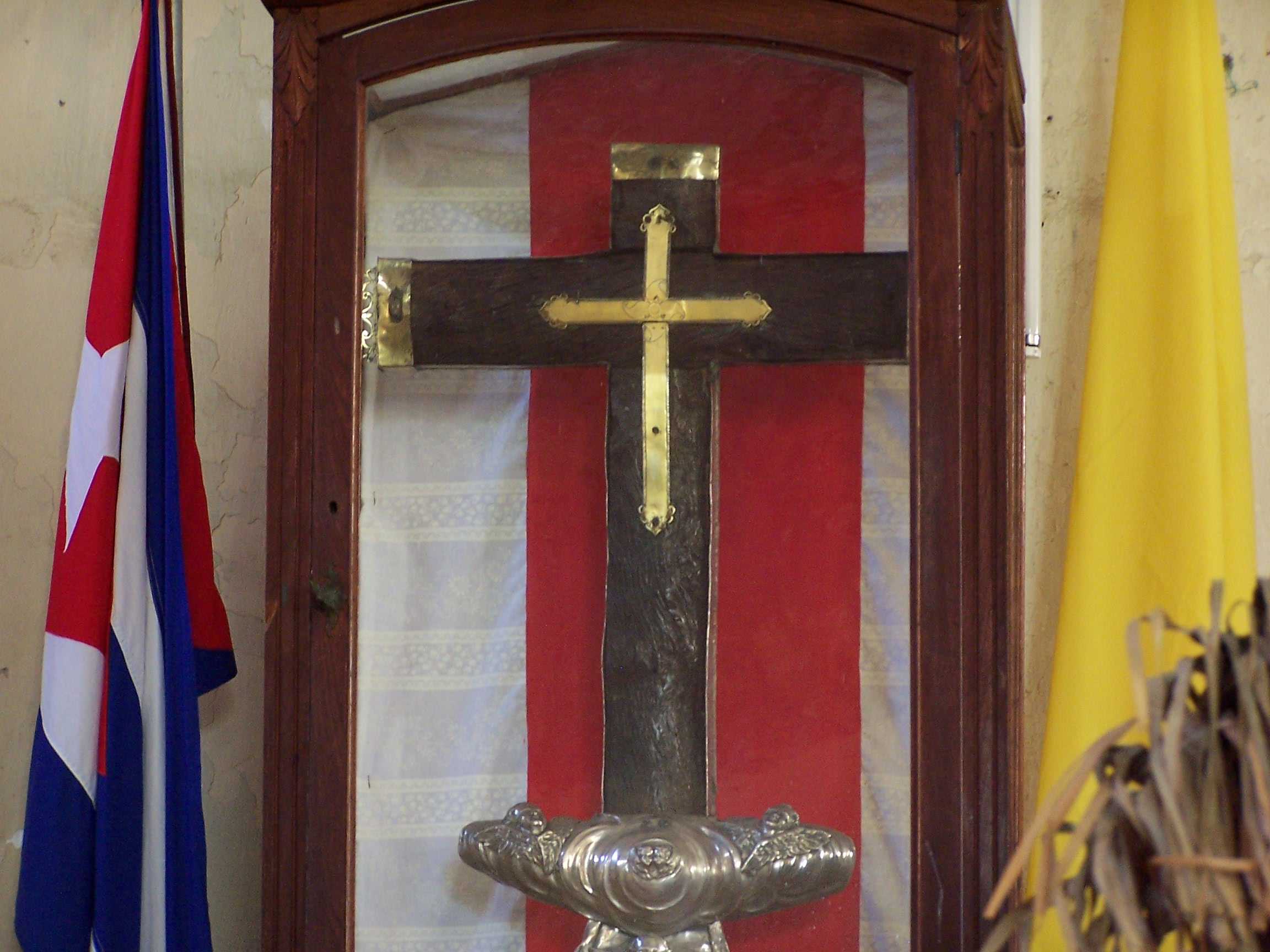
Cruz de Parra

Christopher Columbus landed in Cuba in a place he named Porto Santo. It is generally assumed from his description that this was Baracoa, although there are also claims it was Gibara. But Columbus also described a nearby table mountain, which is almost certainly nearby El Yunque. He wrote in his logbook "the most beautiful place in the world ...I heard the birds sing that they will never ever leave this place...". According to tradition, Columbus put a cross called Cruz de la Parra in the sands of what would later become Baracoa harbor.

Around 15 August 1511 (the official foundation day) Diego Velázquez de Cuéllar was appointed the first governor of Cuba and built a villa here and named the place "Nuestra Señora de la Asunción de Baracoa", thus making Baracoa the first capital of Cuba. In 1518 it received the title of city and the first Cuban bishop was appointed here. As a result, several remains of the Spanish occupation can still be seen here, such as the fortifications El Castillo, Matachín and La Punta and the cemetery.

During the 17th and 18th centuries, its isolated location made Baracoa a haven for illegal trade with French and British merchants. During the War of Jenkins' Ear, Luis de Unzaga, an officer in the newly organized Fixed Regiment of Havana, was appointed as chief commander of Baracoa in 1744 and managed thanks to a network of confidants, Irish merchants and French military personnel to be warned of possible British attacks. This allowed Baracoa a certain peace and commercial prosperity between Saint-Domingue and Cuba despite the time of conflict. At the beginning of the 19th century many Saint Dominicans fled here from the Haitian Revolution, who started growing coffee and cocoa.

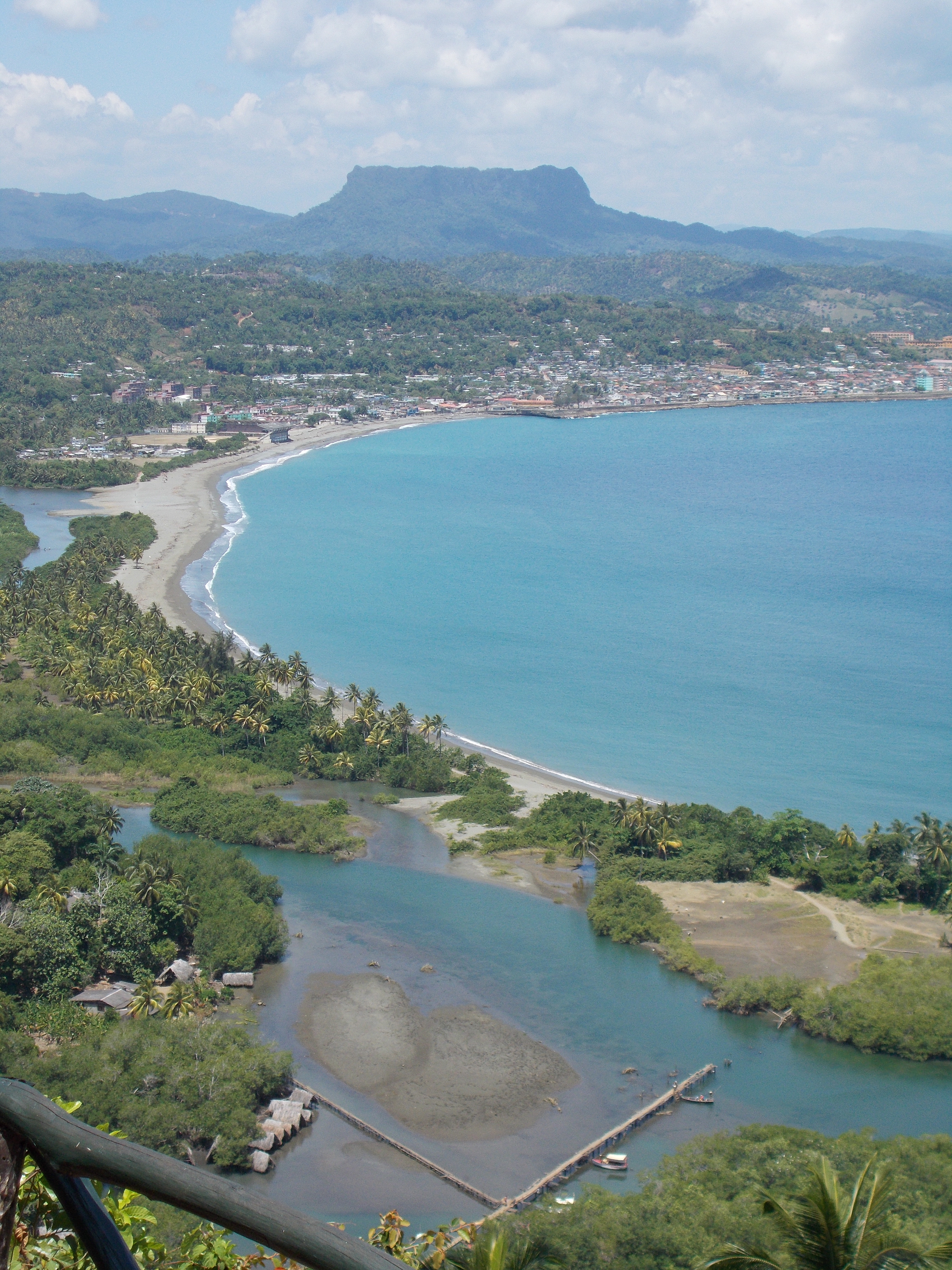
The Bay of Honey with El Yunque towering in the background

From the middle of the 19th century many expeditions of independence fighters landed here (including Antonio Maceo and José Martí) which greatly helped the independence from Spain in 1902.

Before the Cuban Revolution the only access was by sea, but in the 1960s a 120-kilometre-long (75 mi) road from Guantánamo named La Farola was built through the mountains, which was one of the showcases of the revolution. The road had already been planned by the Batista government, but never got built. The highest point of the road is at over 600 m and it passes over 11 bridges.

== Economy ==
The main products in the region are banana, coconut and cacao. It is Cuba's main chocolate manufacturing area. Theobroma cacao trees are cultivated under groves of Royal palm on the banks of the Río Miel, Río Duaba, Río Toa and Río Yumuri. Ecotourism and birdwatching are important in Baracoa due to the Cuban moist forests.

=== Tourism ===
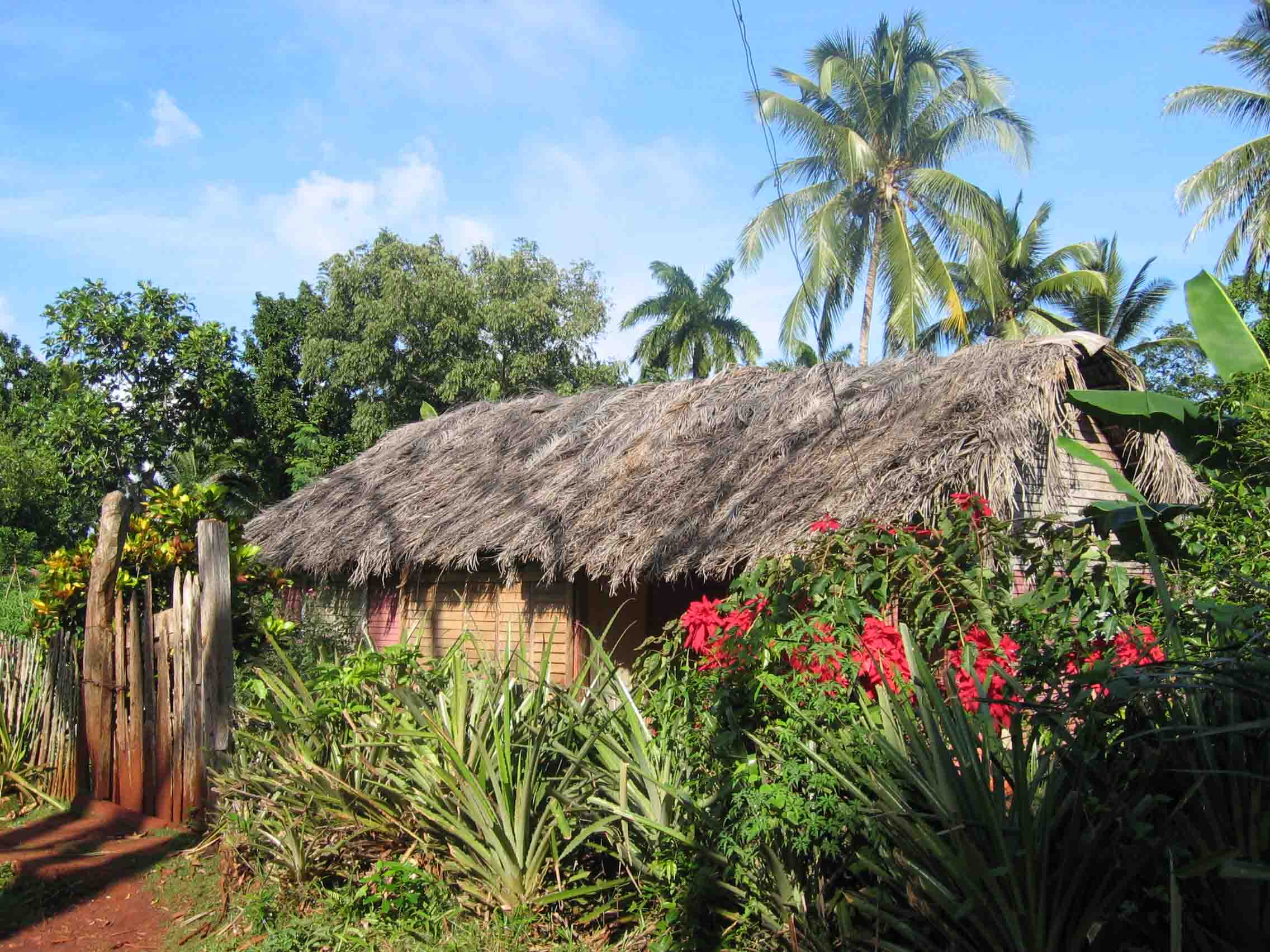
A cabin in the hills near Baracoa

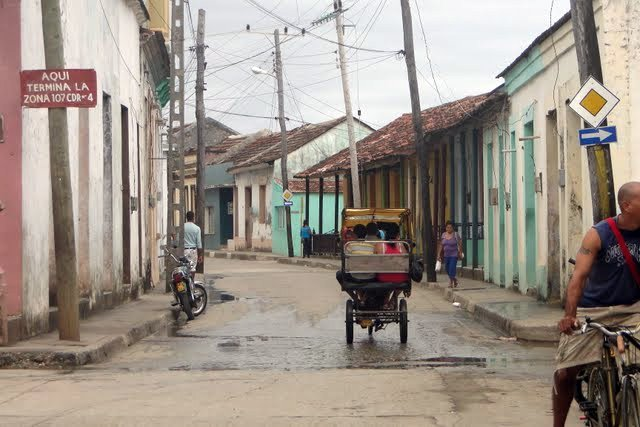
Street in the old city of Baracoa

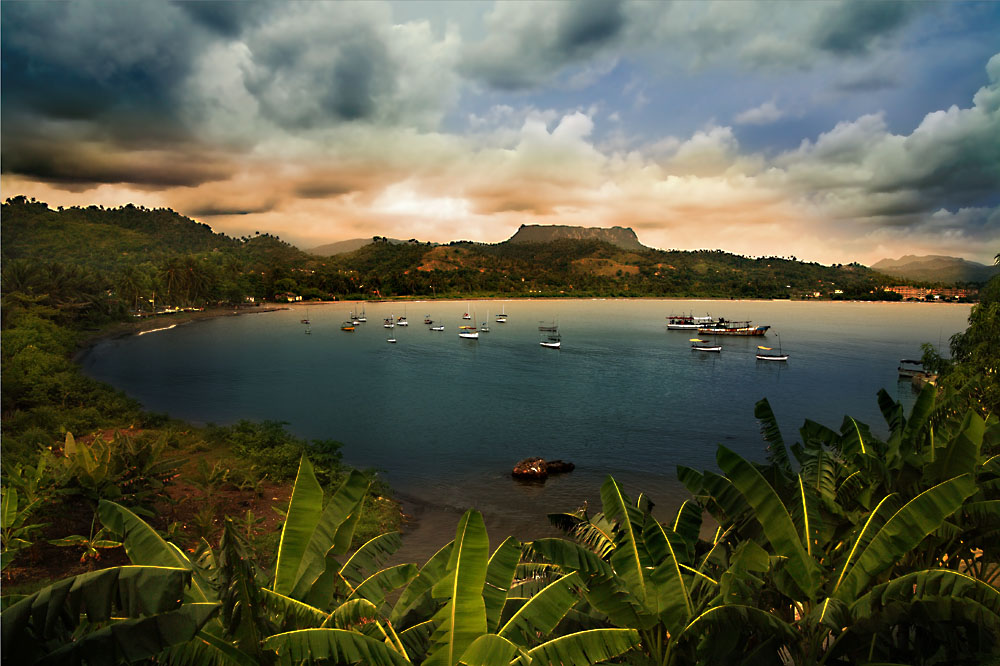
Sunset on the bay (El Yunque in background)

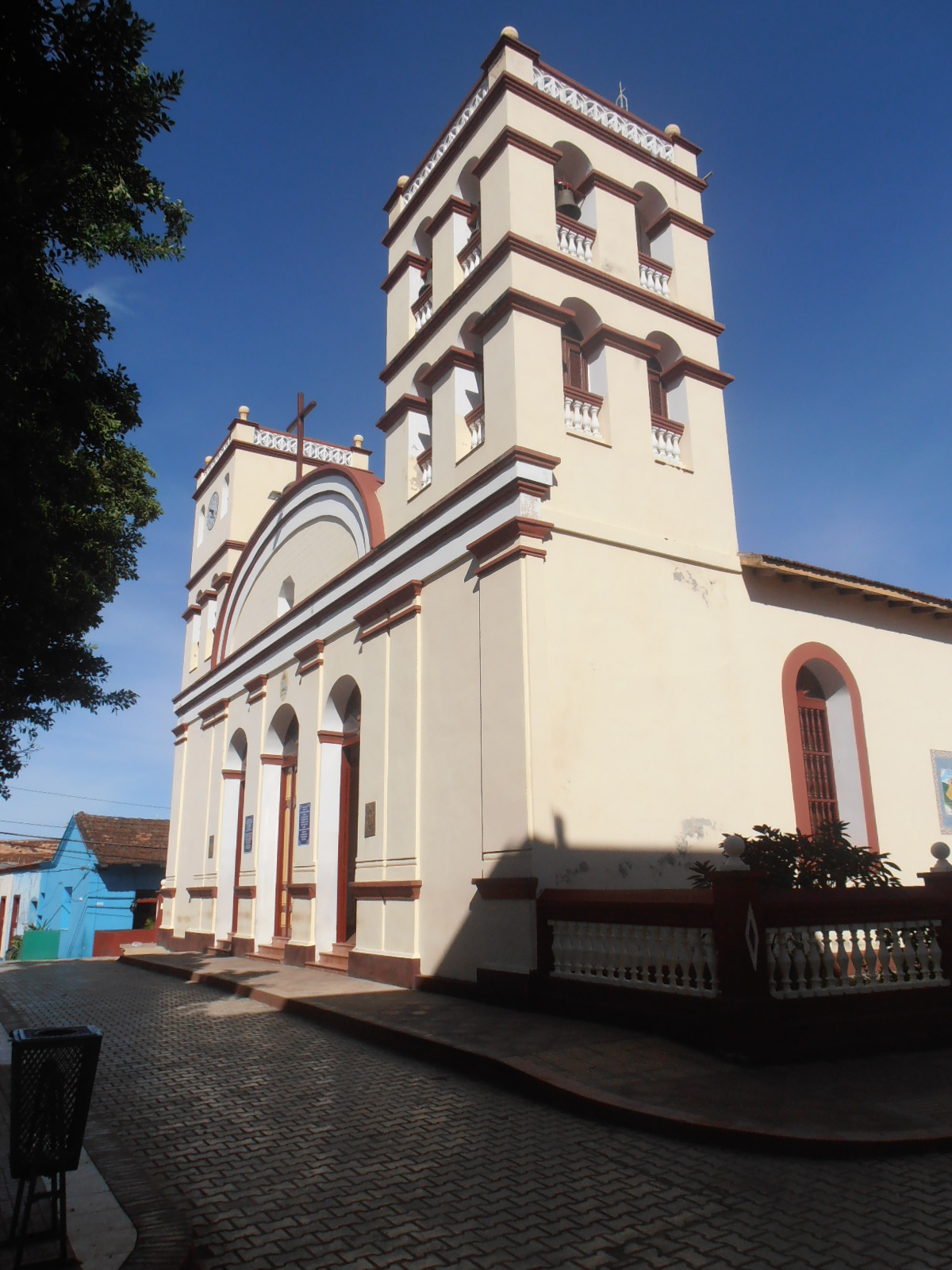
Co-Cathedral of Baracoa

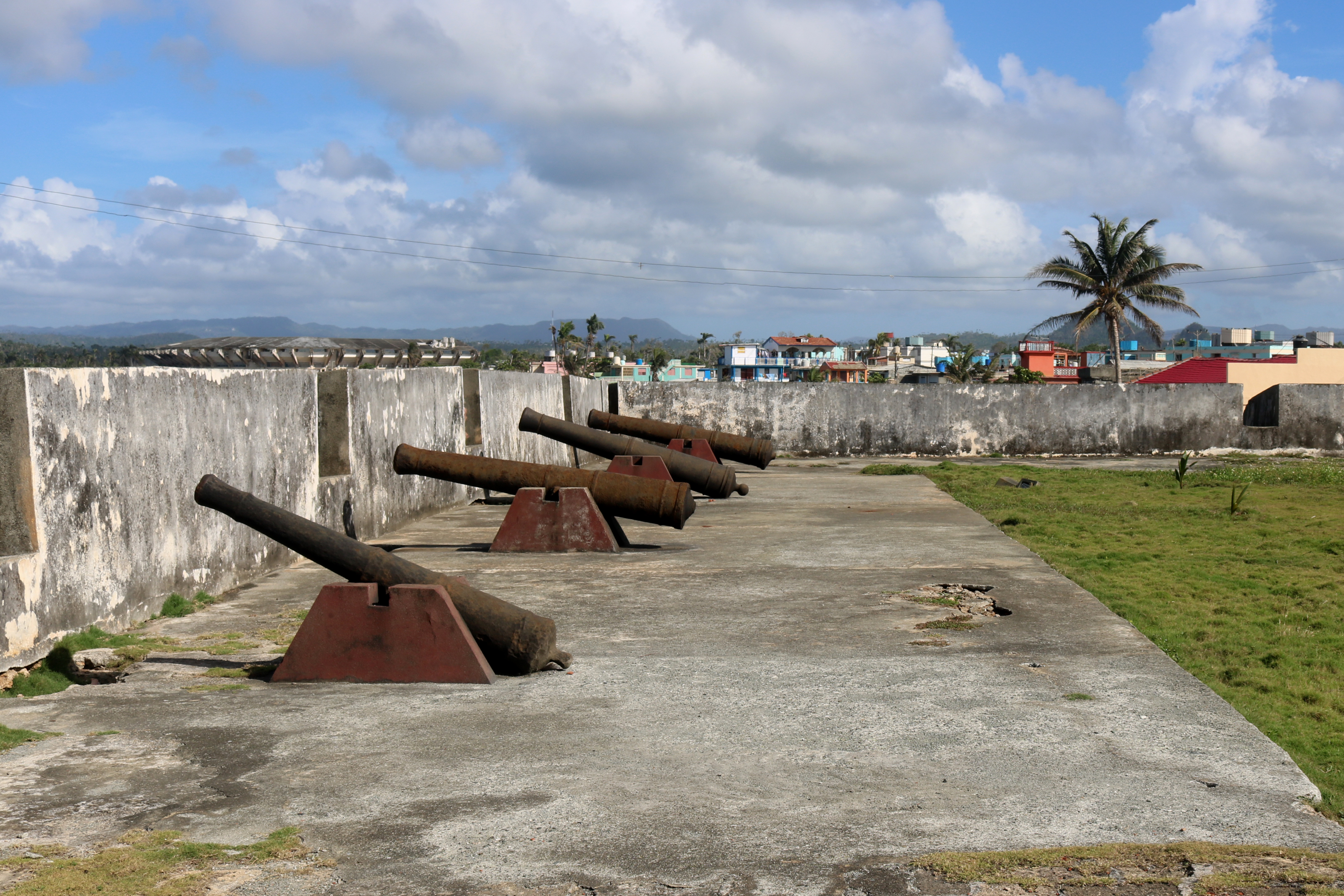
Colonial Fort Matachín

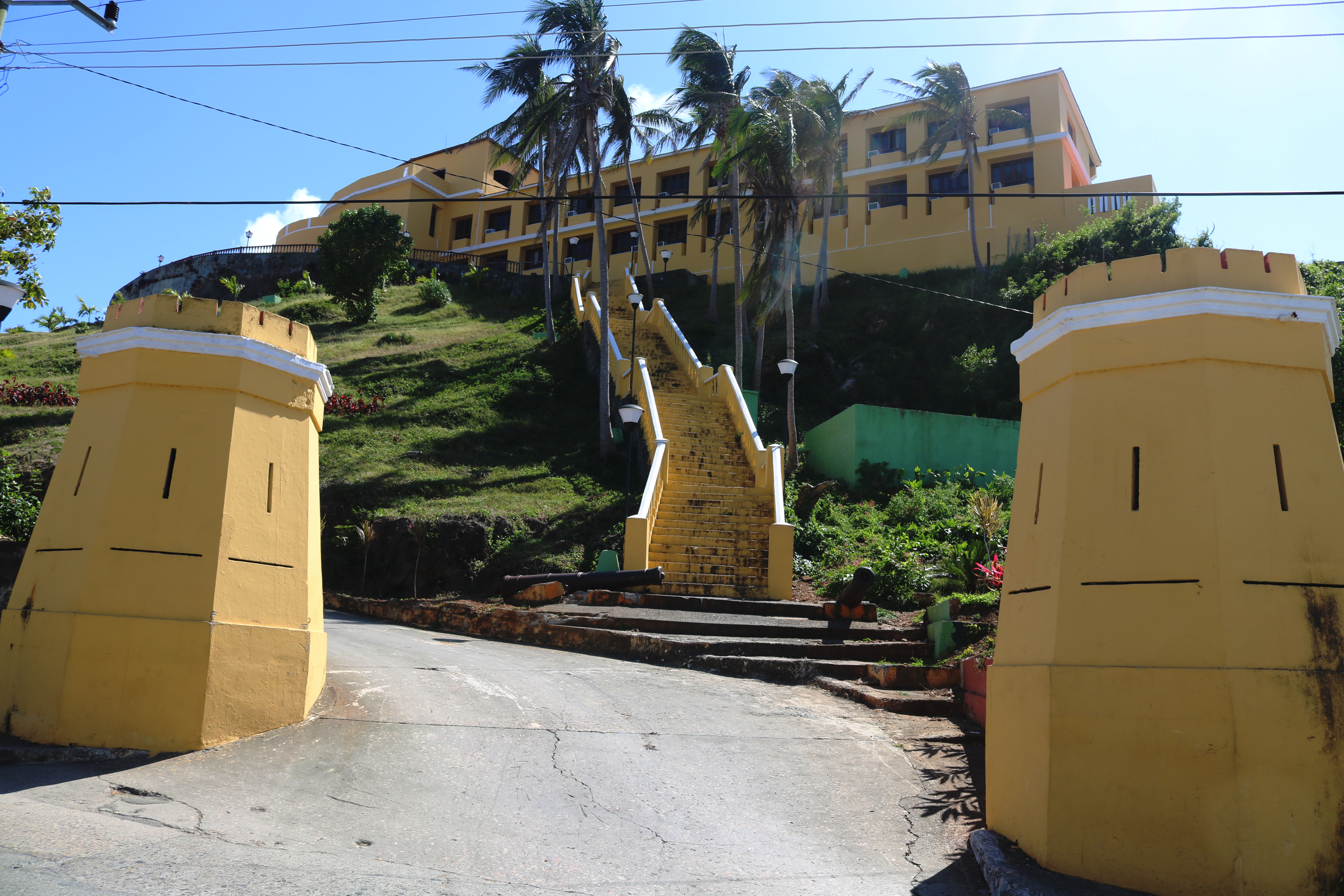
Castillo de Seburoco

The remote location at the eastern end of the Cuban island has kept the influence of mass tourism quite low, despite the idyllic location. Baracoa can be reached by bus from Santiago de Cuba (four hours) or by plane from Havana (two hours).

To the east the Fuerte Matachín (built in 1802) is still standing and contains houses and museums. To the west the Fuerte La Punta (built in 1803) houses a restaurant; there is a small beach next to the fort. The third fort, El Castillo, which sits on a steep hill with a commanding view of the town and both bays, is now Hotel El Castillo. The other hotels in Baracoa are Hotel Porto Santo, Hotel La Rusa, Hostal La Habanera and Villa Maguana. There are also a few casas particulares. The Catedral Nuestra Señora de la Asunción houses the remains of the Cruz de la Parra, a cross that Columbus is supposed to have brought from Spain. Although it has been carbon dated to approximately that period, it is made from a local type of wood, which means at least part of the story is not correct.

There are two music venues near the central Parque Independencia, the touristy Casa de la Cultura and the more traditional Casa de la Trova.

Nearby are the rivers Miel and Toa, the latter of which has many waterfalls, the best known of which is 'el Saltadero', which is 17 m high.

The 575-metre-high (1,886 ft) table mountain El Yunque ('Anvil') is 10 km to the west of Baracoa. It is a remnant of a plateau and because of its isolation it houses several unique species of ferns and palms. The only official and easiest approach to climb it starts at campismo El Yunque (simple lodgings for Cubans only), where a guide is obligatory (about 15 euro).

From Baracoa, it is possible to visit the Parque Nacional Alejandro de Humboldt located about 20 kilometers north.

Salto Fino is the highest waterfall in the Caribbean, located in this municipality, is produced by a sudden drop in the Arroyo del Infierno ('Hell's stream'), a tributary of the Quibijan river. That river, along with 71 others, flows into the Toa river, which is the largest river in Cuba. The 305-meter-high Salto Fino waterfall is recorded as the 20th-highest water chute in the world.

=== Gastronomy ===
Baracoa has typical dishes, such as cucurucho, a mix of coconut and much sugar and other ingredients like orange, guava and pineapple and wrapped in a palm leaf. Another is Bacán, which is made from bananas and wrapped in a banana leaf. And of course there is much chocolate in this cocoa-producing region.

== Demographics ==
In 2022, the municipality of Baracoa had a population of 78,056. With a total area of 977 km^{2} (377 sq mi), it has a population density of 80/km^{2} (210/sq mi).

== Transport ==
Baracoa is the eastern end of Carretera Central, a highway spanning the length of the island of Cuba for 1,435 km, that ends in the village of La Fé, Pinar del Río Province.

=== Airport ===
Gustavo Rizo Airport (IATA: BCA, ICAO: MUBA) is a regional airport that serves this town. This is a small airport that usually operates with national flights. Located west of the bay near the Hotel Porto Santo and about 4 km (2 1/2 miles) NNW of Baracoa. Although flights are infrequent, Cubana de Aviación flies here from Santiago de Cuba and Havana.

== Notable residents ==
- Pablo Borges Delgado, Cuban artist, born in Baracoa
- Eduardo Davidson, Cuban composer, born in Baracoa
- Arnaldo Tamayo Méndez, first Cuban in space, born in Baracoa

== See also ==
- List of cities in Cuba
- Municipalities of Cuba
