= Pirouline =

US brand of rolled sweet wafer cookie

- Pirouline cookie tin
- Product type: Rolled sweet wafer biscuit/cookie
- Current owner: DeBeukelaer Corporation
- Country: Belgium and United States
- Introduced: Early 20th century (Belgium) and 1984 (United States)
- Markets: Worldwide
- Website: Pirouline.com

Pirouline is a brand of creme-filled rolled wafer cookie sold in the United States by the DeBeukelaer Corporation.

Piroulines were developed in 1984 by Peter DeBeukelaer, and are very similar to the Caprice Papadopoulou Wafers developed in Greece in 1978. Pirouline cookies are toasted, rolled wafers that are filled with creme and sealed with a cylindrical swirled stripe. They are typically sold in a cylindrical tin. The cookies are produced in a 115,000-square-foot (10,700 m^{2}) baking facility with more than 200 employees.

== History ==
- Circa 1860, the DeBeukelaer family started making biscuits in Belgium. They founded the 1st Biscuit and Wafer Co., which the company claims invented the rolled wafer cookie.
- In 1978, Peter DeBeukelaer, a descendant of the original founders in Belgium, founded DBC Corporation, also doing business as DeBeukelaer Corporation and as the DeBeukelaer Cookie Co. The same year, the company trademarked the Pirouline Swirl.
- In 1984, DeBeukelaer established a cookie factory in Madison, Mississippi, to make Pirouline.
- In 1993, the company introduced a cream-filled version, which they served in tins.
- In 2001, the company launched its own tin can manufacturing to reduce the carbon footprint of shipping cans from suppliers, and to better match supply to demand.
- In 2007, the company opened a 100,000-square-foot (9,300 m^{2}) factory and warehouse to increase production.
- In 2009, the company started packaging Pirouline in a 3.25 ounces (92 g) tin can.
- In July 2026, Griesson-de Beukelaer company acquired DBC.

== Versions ==
The original Pirouline was a hollow rolled European style wafer with the now-trademarked helical swirl, the Pirouline Swirl, and it was lined with chocolate. In 1993, a version of the biscuit was introduced filled with a chocolate hazelnut creme filling, and named Crème de Pirouline. Other flavors of crème that have been produced include vanilla, strawberry, pumpkin spice and dulce de leche. Originally sold in 2.5 ounces (71 g) boxes the chocolate-lined biscuits are always sold in boxes, while the cream-filled ones are sold in tins or cartons. Today, Pirouline produces an entire line of specialty cookies sold in grocery and specialty food shops from coast to coast, as well as internationally.

== See also ==
- Barquillo
- Neula
