= Co-Cathedral of Baracoa =

Coordinates: 20.34751°N 74.49665°W

Our Lady of the Assumption Co-Cathedral
- Concatedral de Nuestra Señora de la Asunción
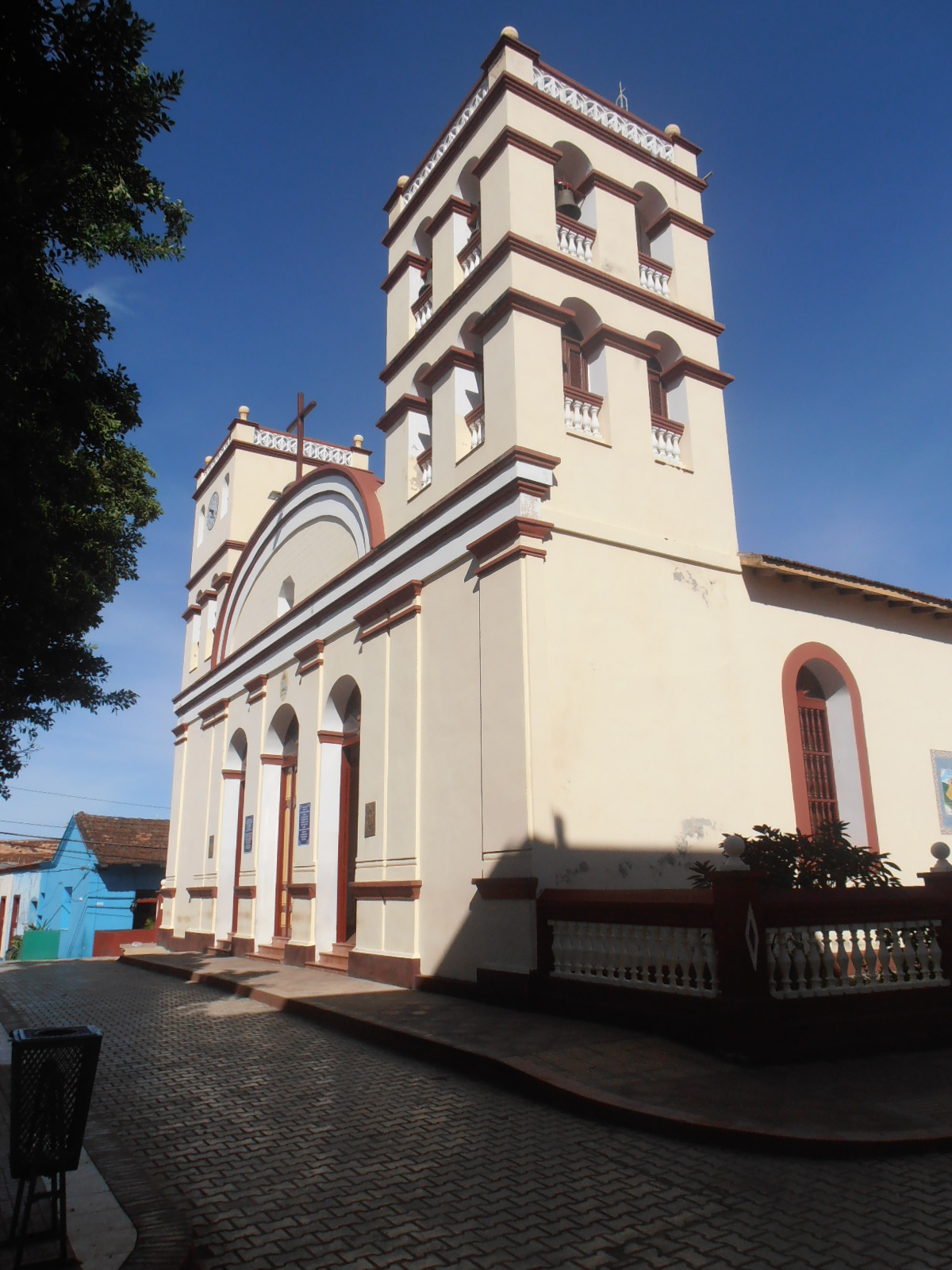
- Our Lady of the Assumption Co-Cathedral
- Location: Baracoa
- Country: Cuba
- Denomination: Roman Catholic Church

The Our Lady of the Assumption Co-Cathedral (Spanish: Concatedral de Nuestra Señora de la Asunción) also called Baracoa Cathedral is a religious building affiliated with the Catholic Church which is located in the town of Baracoa on the island and Caribbean nation of Cuba.

The present church has its origins in the church built in 1807 during the Spanish colonization of Cuba, was partially damaged in 1833 and was renovated almost entirely in 1886. The portico was completed in 1905. By the early twenty-first century the church had deteriorated considerably but it was renovated and restored again in works that ended in 2012.

Follow the Roman or Latin rite and with the St. Catherine of Ricci Cathedral in Guantánamo is the main church of the diocese of Guantánamo-Baracoa (Dioecesis Guantanamensis-Baracoensis) created by Pope John Paul II in 1998.

== See also ==
- Roman Catholicism in Cuba
- Co-Cathedral of the Assumption of the Virgin Mary, Opava

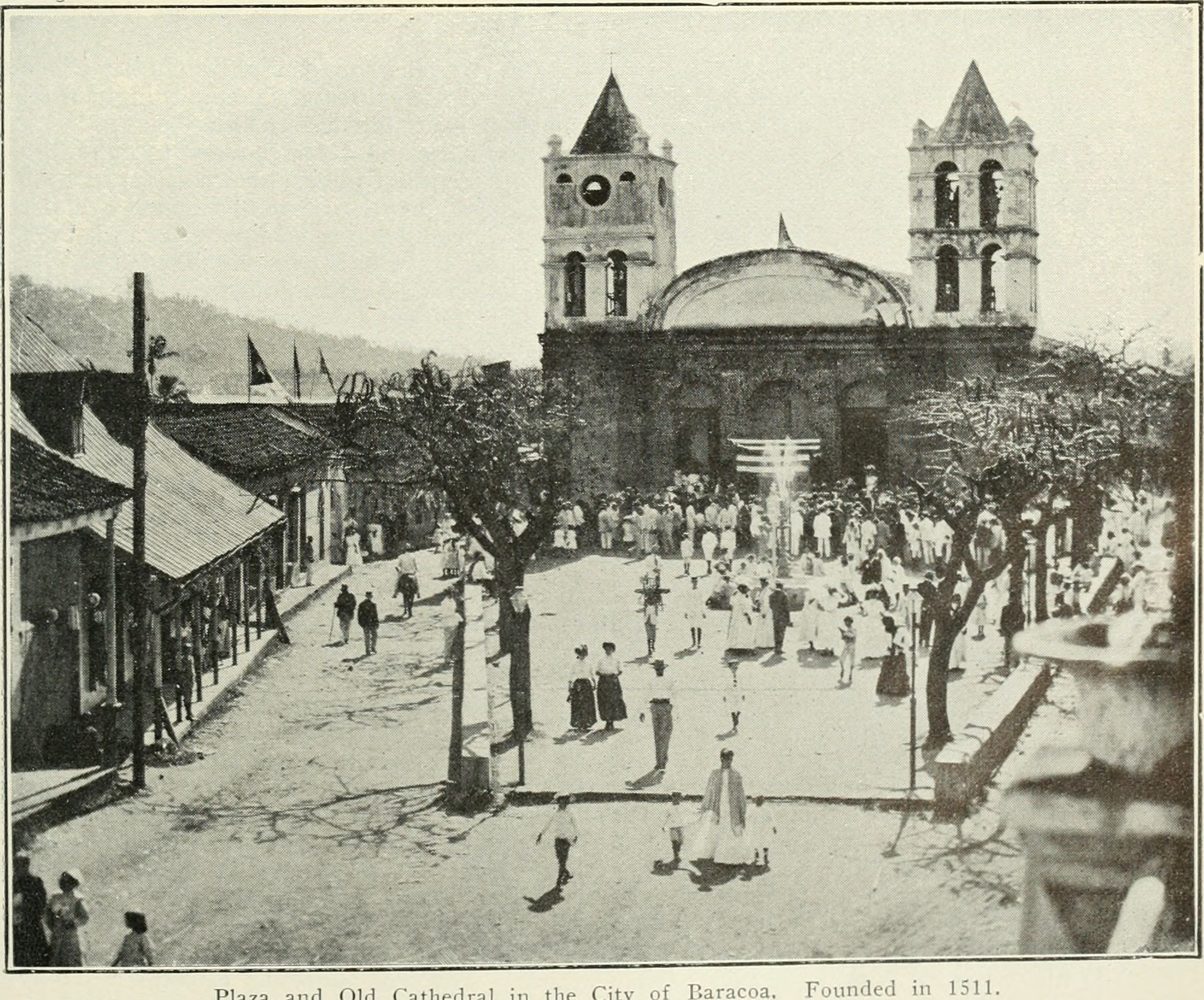
The cathedral in 1911 with its spires. The Cuba review, Munson Steamship Line.
