= Cuchuflí =

South American sweet food

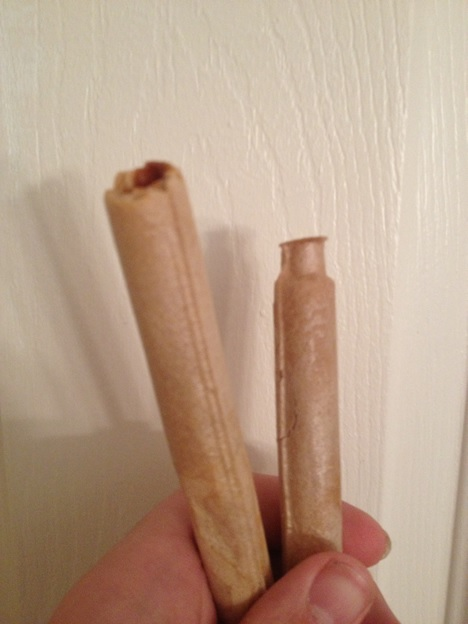
Two cuchuflíes.

Cuchuflí (known as cubanitos in Argentina) is a popular confection in Chile and Argentina. Similar to barquillos, they are tubular-shaped desserts made from sugar, egg whites, flour, butter, and vanilla that are often filled with dulce de leche or other sweet fillings. Cuchuflíes are sold in supermarkets, neighborhood shops, and bakeries in addition to street vendors and on beaches, and they are sometimes covered in chocolate.

== See also ==
- List of desserts
