= Neula =

Catalan Christmas biscuit

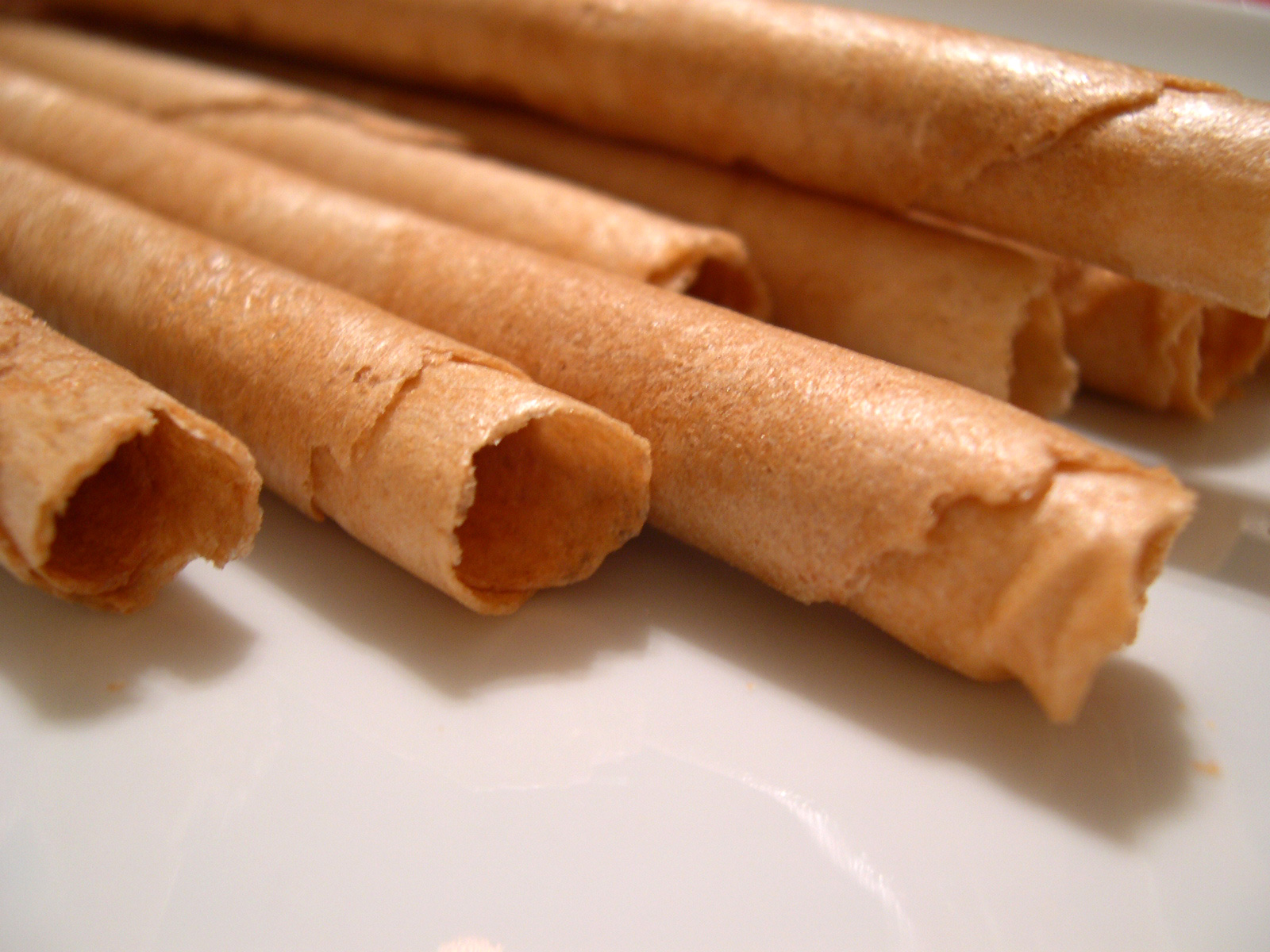
- Type: Biscuit
- Place of origin: Spain
- Region or state: Catalonia
- Main ingredients: flour, butter, egg whites, sugar, lemon

Neula (Catalan pronunciation: [ˈnewlə], plural: neules) is a type of Catalan biscuit, eaten traditionally at Christmas with cava wine, which they are often dipped into, and torró nougat. Neula consists of a very thin sheet of a mixture of egg whites, butter, sugar and flour, flavoured with lemon and rolled.

Other popular versions include neules stuffed with torró de Xixona, or covered with a chocolate lay. Traditionally eaten at Christmas, they are also eaten at other times, sometimes with crema catalana or ice cream.

== Origin ==
The noun neula comes from the Latin nebula, meaning "fog", referring to the biscuit's fine and light texture. Some documents show that neules existed before torró, and torró has been shown to exist at least in the Middle Ages and was eaten, for example, at Jaume I's daughter's wedding.

== Production ==
Artisan making neules

Making neules at home is not easy because of their lightness and slimness, so they are usually bought by Catalonians in professional patisseries.

== Other products ==
In Belgium there are gaufres that, even though they are much thicker and flat, have the same origin as neules. The same origin have other some stuffed or not waffles, as Dutch stroopwafels. In other regions of Spain there are a sort of rolled biscuits called "barquillos", but they are very much stronger, harder and thicker than waffles and neules, bigger than neules and they taste different.

== See also ==
- Catalan cuisine
- Pirouline
