= Cruz de la Parra =

Coordinates: 20.3500°N 74.4986°W

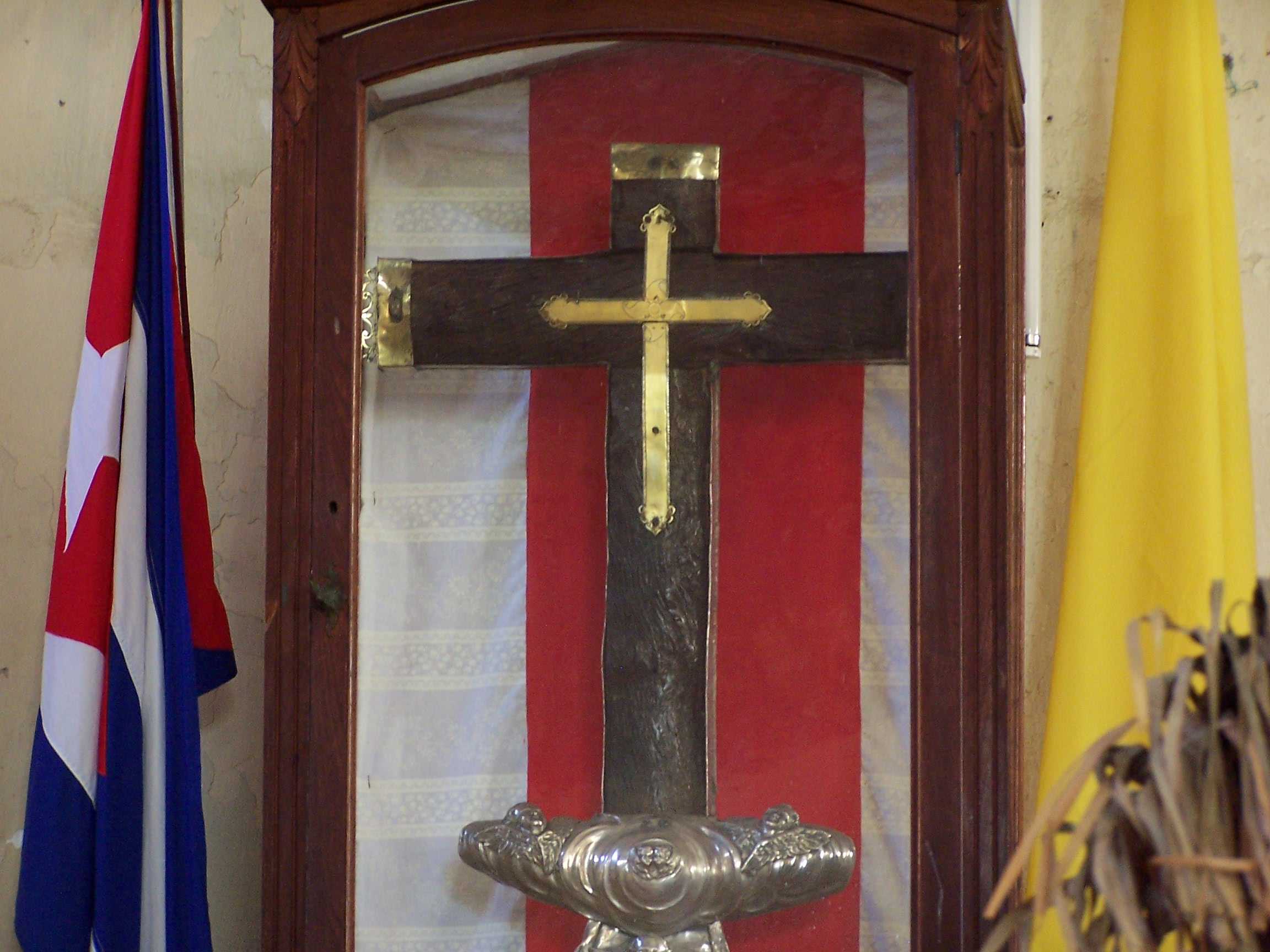
Cruz de la Parra; Baracoa

La Cruz de la Parra (English: The Cross of the Vinewood), or The Sacred Cross of Parra, as it is referred to in English, is a wooden cross which was erected by Christopher Columbus in Cuba after he had landed there during his First Voyage in 1492. It is considered the oldest artifact connected with Columbus to be found in the Americas.

Referring to Columbus, Friar Bartolomé de las Casas, O.P., who later chronicled the conquest of the Americas, wrote that, on 1 December 1492, "he placed a large cross at the entrance of that port, which I believe he named Porto Santo".

Of the 29 crosses planted by Columbus in the New World, this is believed to be the only one to have survived. It was offered as a gift to Pope John Paul II by the people of Cuba on the occasion of his visit in 1998, the first ever by a pope, but he declined to remove it from the island.

The relic remains enshrined in Baracoa, Cuba.
