= Cucurucho =

Cuban dessert

- Type: Dessert
- Place of origin: Cuba
- Region or state: Baracoa
- Main ingredients: Coconut, sugar, orange, guava, pineapple, papaya.
- Food energy (per serving): 200 kcal (840 kJ)

Cucurucho is a sheet of paper, cardboard or wafer (cookie) rolled into a cone shape that contains different types of ice cream, sweets, candies, seeds, etc.

== Cucurucho of Baracoa ==
Cucurucho is a local delicacy of the city of Baracoa in eastern Cuba. Wrapped in a cone-shaped palm leaf (hence the name: cucurucho - Spanish for cone or cornet), it is a mix of coconut, sugar and other ingredients such as orange, guava and pineapple.

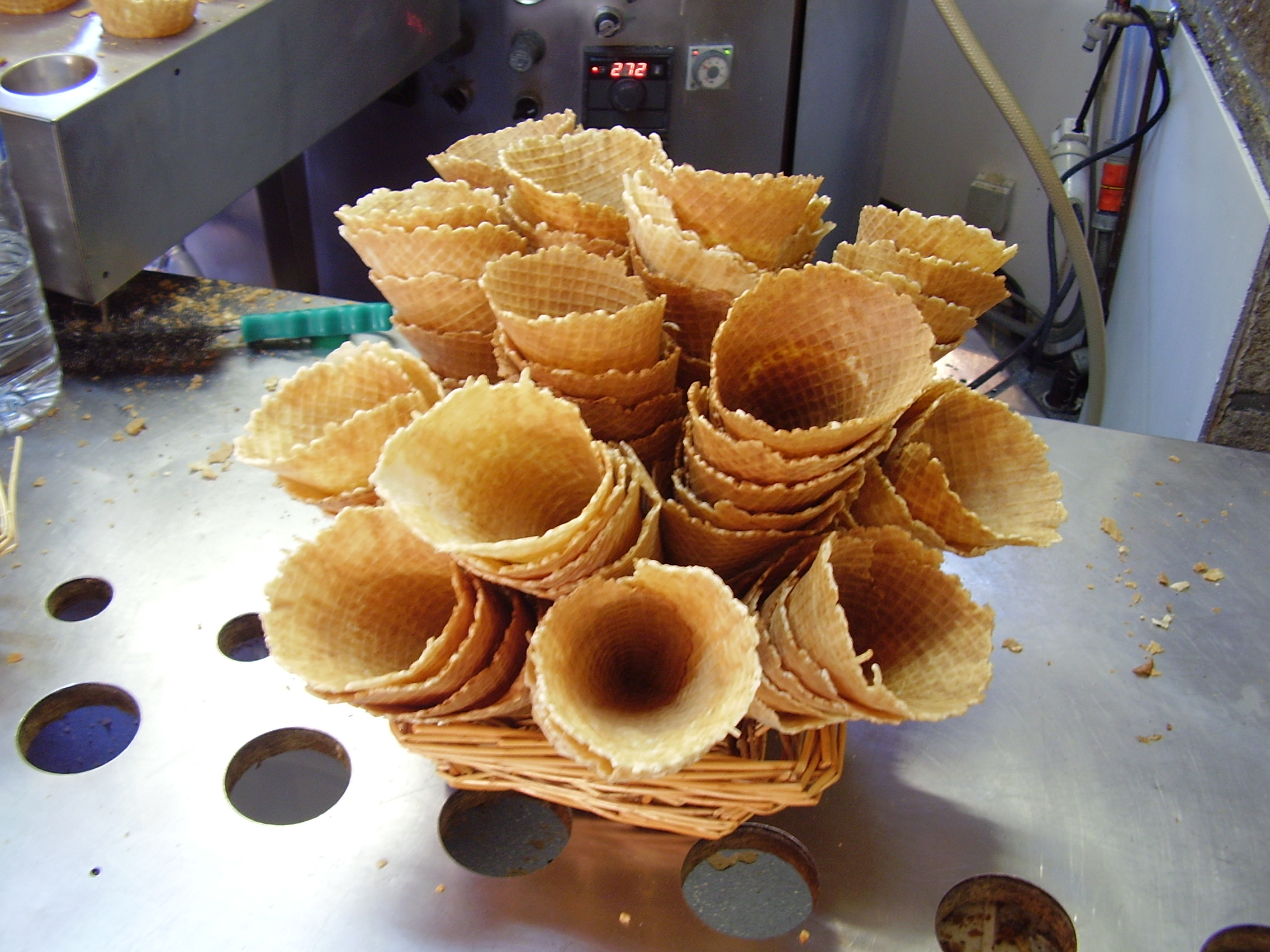
Cucuruchos or cones.

== Cucurucho in music ==
The conical container, whether cardboard or of another type, is also known as a cucurucho. The song in question is “El manisero” (“The Peanut Vendor”), which in Spanish the lyrics say: don't go to sleep, without eating a “peanut cone” (“cucurucho de maní“).

== See also ==
- Cuban cuisine
