= Goro (biscuit) =

Norwegian biscuit

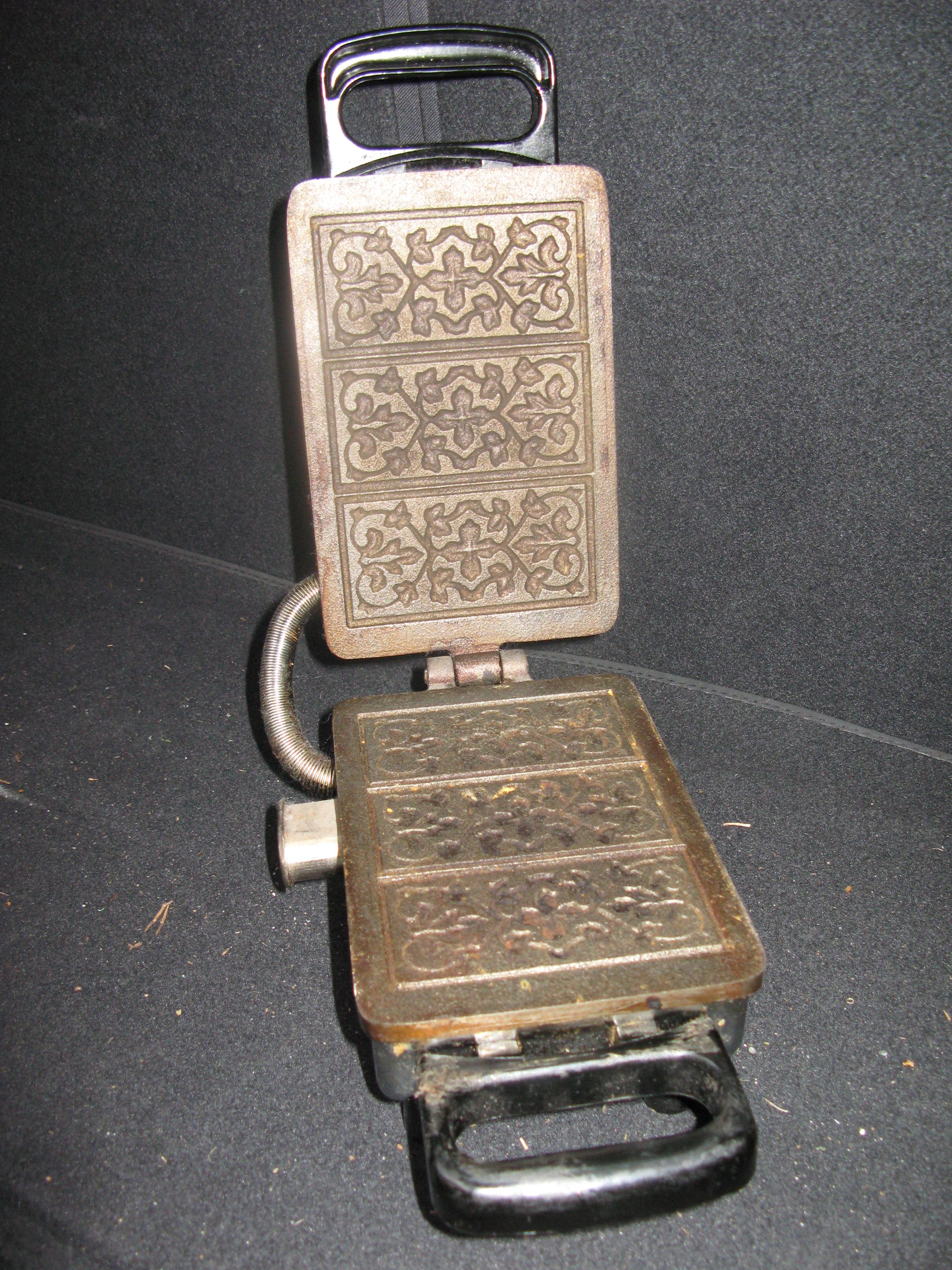
- Goro iron
- Type: Biscuit
- Place of origin: Norway
- Main ingredients: eggs, sugar, cream, fat (butter or lard), flour, cardamom and other spices

Goro (Gorån in Swedish) is a traditional Norwegian and Swedish biscuit.

Goro are pressed flat and commonly flavored with cardamom. It is a cross between a biscuit, a cracker, and a waffle. Goros are made from a mixture consisting of eggs, sugar, cream, fat (butter or lard), flour and spices, baked in a special Goro iron (Gorojern). Goro cookies forms an important part of the cuisine associated with the Norwegian and Swedish Christmas celebrations.
