= Casa particular =

Private accommodation in Cuba

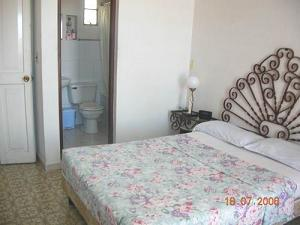
A typical room in a casa particular in Old Havana, Havana, Cuba

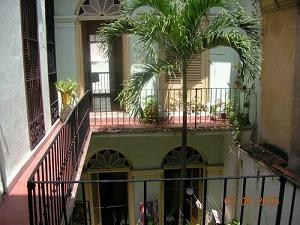
The patio in a colonial casa particular in Old Havana, in Havana, Cuba

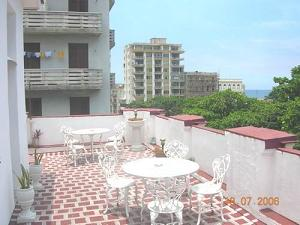
The terrace in a casa particular in Old Havana, Cuba

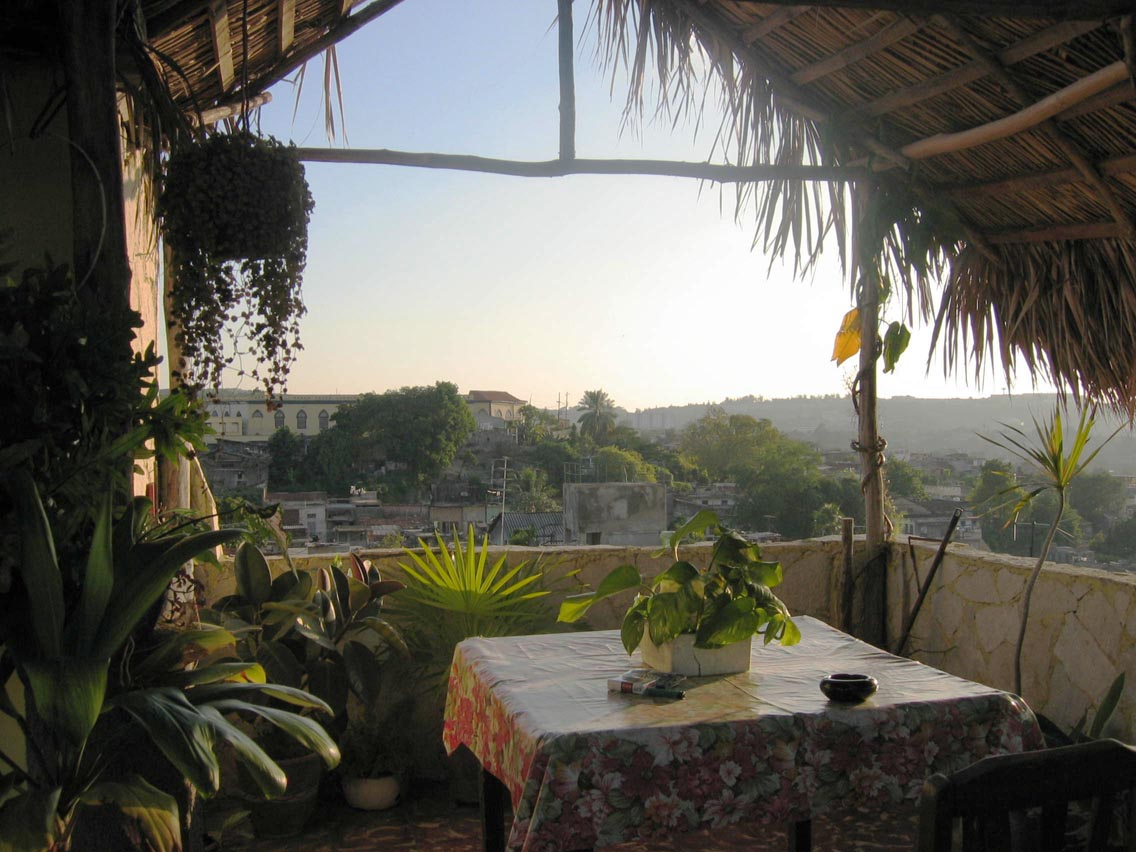
Part of the roof terrace of a casa particular in Santiago de Cuba

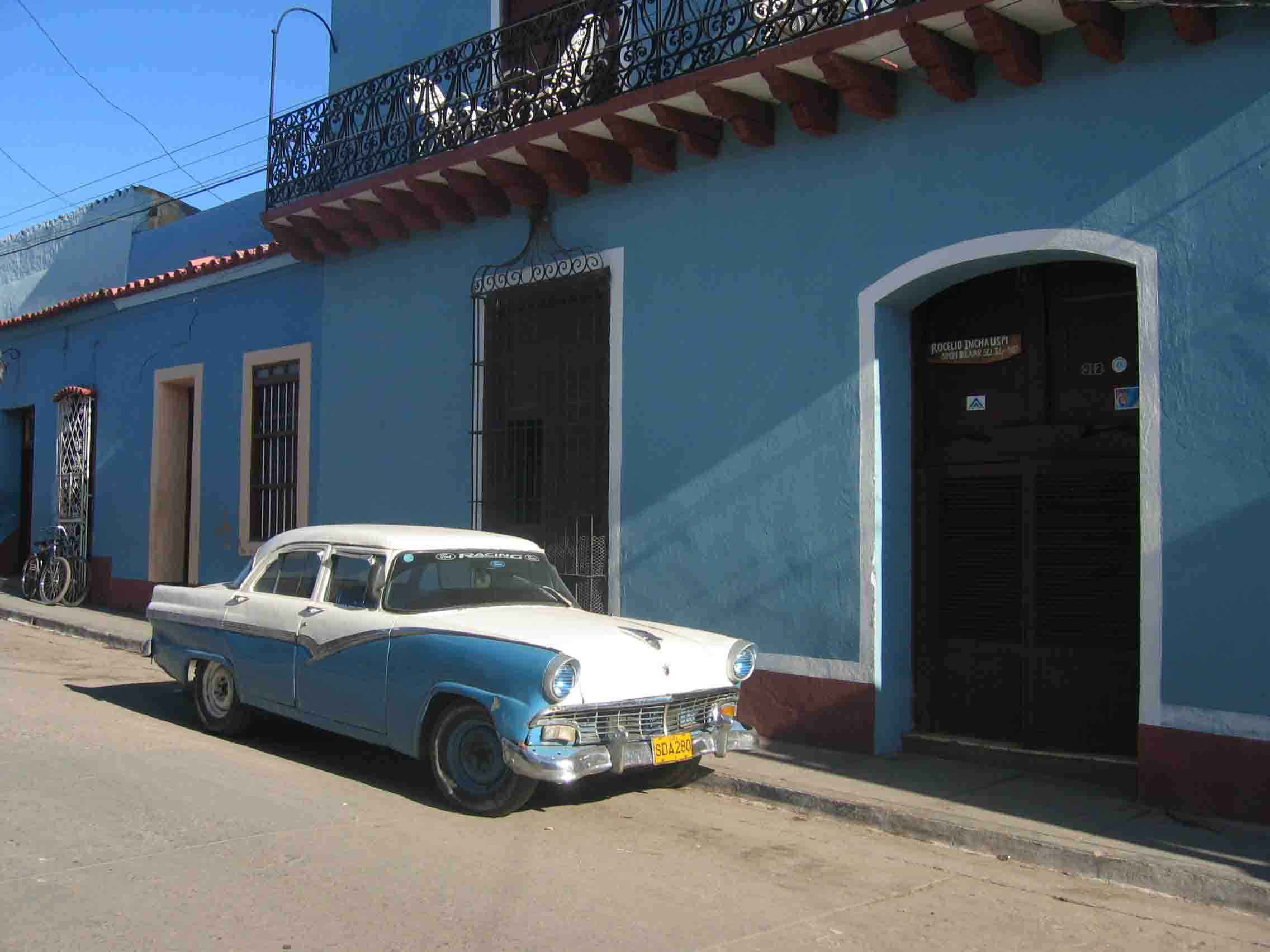
A casa particular in Trinidad, Cuba. Note the sign on the door.

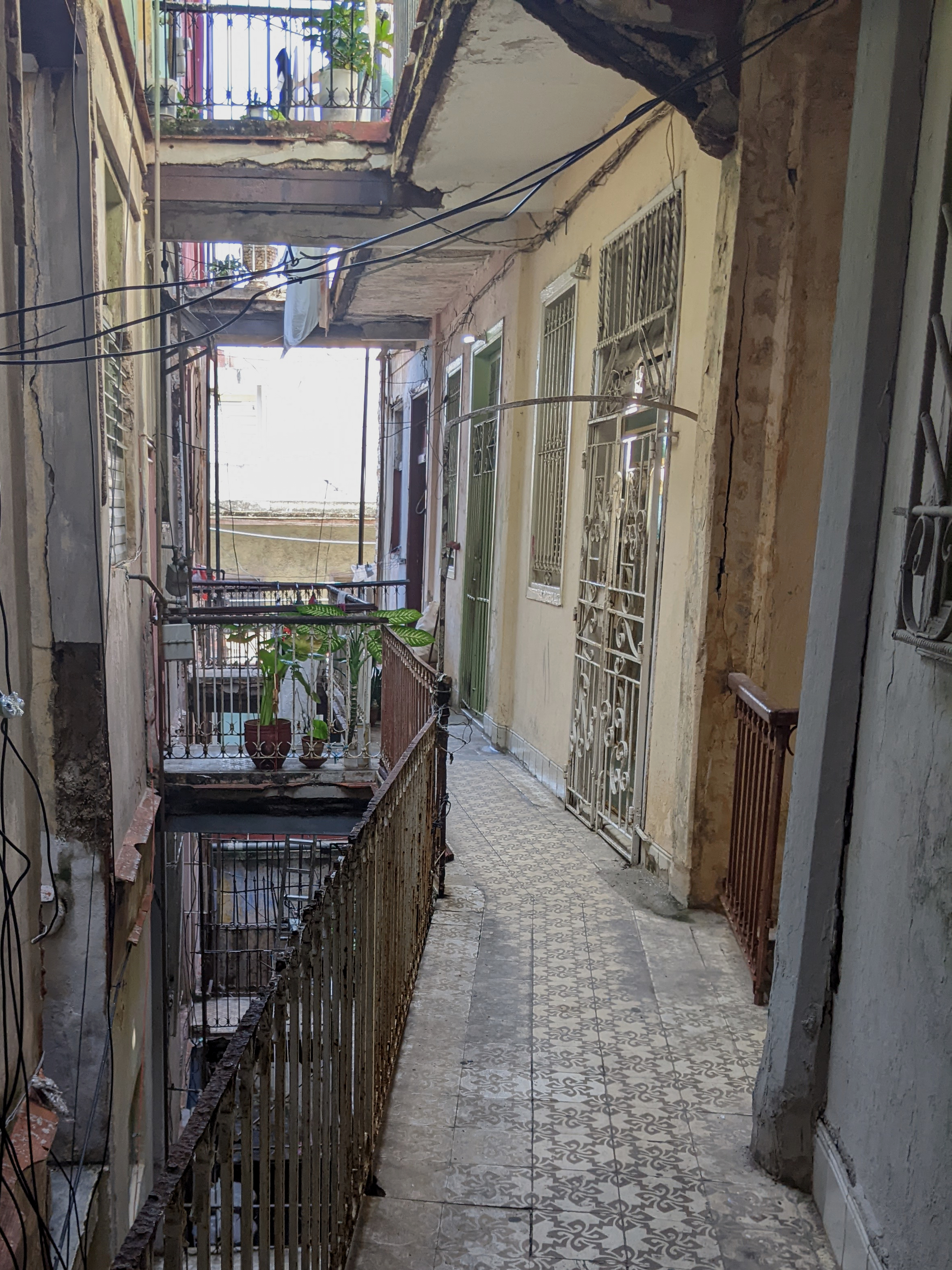
Hallway of a casa particular in Havana in 2023

Casa particular (Spanish for "private house"; plural casas particulares) is a phrase meaning private accommodation or private homestays in Cuba, very similar to a bed and breakfast, although it can also take the form of a vacation rental. When the meaning is clear, the term is often shortened to simply casa. Today, many casas particulares are rented through online agencies, some specifically Cuban, and others that work worldwide.

== Varieties ==
A casa particular is basically a private family establishment that provides paid lodging, usually on a short-term basis. This term applies to full apartments and houses, rooms inside people's homes, mini-apartments or rooms with separate entrance (studio or efficiency type rooms).

It is also considered a type of boarding house typically operated out of a single family residence where guests can be accommodated at night in private bedrooms (which may or may not be equipped with private baths) and where breakfast, sometimes continental and sometimes the full English variety, is served in the morning. The business may be operated either as a primary occupation or as a secondary source of income, and the staff often consists of the house's owner(s) and members of their family who live there.

Because they are usually small, rarely with room for more than about 5–6 guests, it is advisable for anyone wanting to stay at a particular casa particular during high season (Nov-Apr) to make advance reservations. However, outside the season there is no need because there are often many such casas, causing competition and opening opportunities to strike a deal. Prices can then drop to 15 euro or even less for longer stays. During high season they can rise to over 30 euro.

Many casas belong to associations and are described in various books and travel guides. Moreover, in spite of the lack of reliable and cost effective internet access on the island, many casas have some sort of web presence. Some casa owners have built their own website. Others uploaded the description of their casa in small directories and websites that manage casas booking on the behalf of tourists. Very recently, following the new course in Cuba–US relations, big online players of the sharing economy and tourism business (such as Airbnb) have started including casas particulares in their offering (exclusively for US users at the moment). All this should make it easier for tourists to make reliable bookings, whereas in the past the typical go-to-market strategy of casa owners used to rely almost exclusively on the intermediation of local street hustlers, known as jineteros.

Casas particulares can be recognised by a small sign on the door, with two blue triangles ("roofs") against a white background, which the owners obtain after paying a fixed per-room annual tax.

In some Cuban cities and tourist resorts, like Varadero, Playa Santa Lucia and Guardalavaca, the local municipal assemblies determined that casas particulares would represent a threat to the hotel industry, and passed some legislation placing regulations and limits on the industry forbidding the operation of these establishments.

== Origins of the term ==
"Casa particular" literally means "private house" but it started to be used to mean "private accommodation" in 1997, when the Cuban government allowed Cubans to rent out rooms in their houses or apartments to tourists, providing Cuban families with new sources of income. As any other type of accommodation in Cuba such as hotels, camping and motels were owned by the government, the term "casa particular" stated that this kind of paid lodging was privately operated.

== Services and facilities ==
Rooms are generally clean and upgraded to tourist standards. It ranges from basic accommodation of a room with a bed, a closet, a small table to full furnished independent apartments upgraded to western standards. Other features found may be a telephone, an alarm clock, and a TV. Food and drink may be supplied by a mini-bar (which often includes a small refrigerator) containing snacks and drinks (to be paid for on departure).

In keeping with the similarity to B&Bs, breakfast is usually included in the price, although one should ask first. Dinner is often also served, but not included in the price. However, if it becomes clear that one plans to generally eat out, the price may go up because this is an important second source of income. The owners will usually offer extra services like laundry service, breakfast & meals or even cigars.

== Classification ==
The cost and quality of casas particulares are usually indicative of the accommodation type and type of services available. Most of the casas particulares are rented for short term to travellers. Long-term accommodation is also provided by some casas, especially for foreign students. In Havana, the casas particulares are usually family apartments and a smaller number of them are houses. In other cities, private accommodation is provided mainly in family houses.

Types of casas particulares rentals:

- Private room: A room, most of the time with a private bathroom. A key to the apartment/house is usually given to the guest.
- Private room with independent entrance: Sometimes the house/apartment is split in order to allow this.
- Apartment: The privacy and independence of a full furnished apartment. Sometimes this apartment is part of a house, being split by a wall usually with a connecting door.
- Studio-type or mini-apartment: Single bedroom-kitchen-living-dining room and bathroom. Sometimes this apartment is part of house being split by a wall usually with a connecting door.
- Villa-type or independent house: An independent property with several rooms such as a bedroom, kitchen, dining room, living room, and bathroom. Some have other conveniences, such as a swimming pool.
