= El Yunque (Cuba) =

Mountain in Cuba

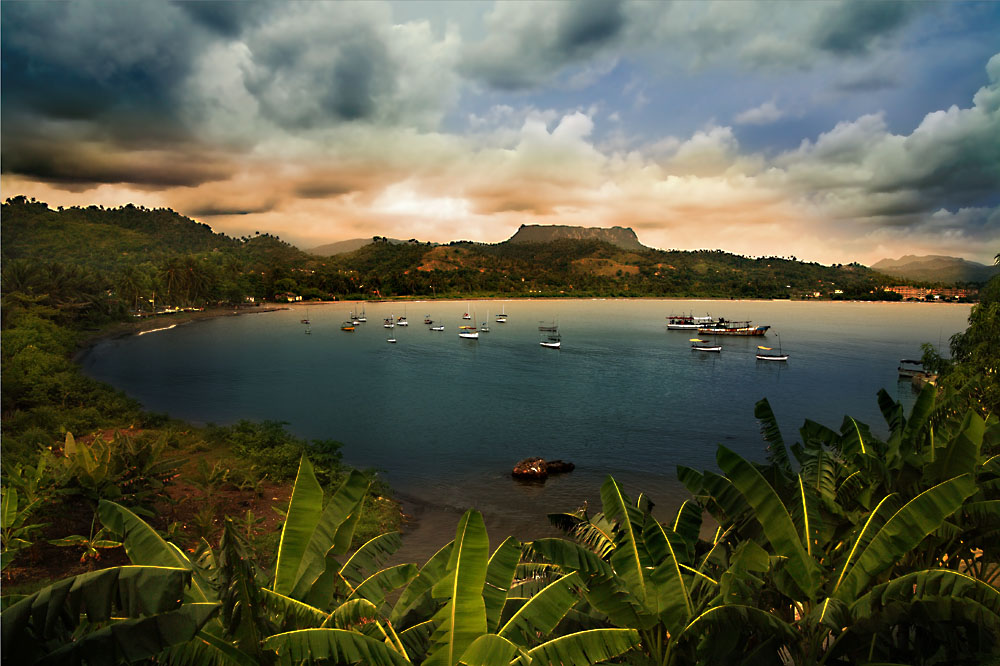

Highest point
- Elevation: 575 m (1,886 ft)
- Coordinates: 20°21′08″N 74°34′26″W

Naming
- English translation: The anvil
- Language of name: (in Spanish)

Geography
- Location: Cuba
- Parent range: Sierra del Purial (Nipe-Sagua-Baracoa)

Geology
- Mountain type: Table mountain

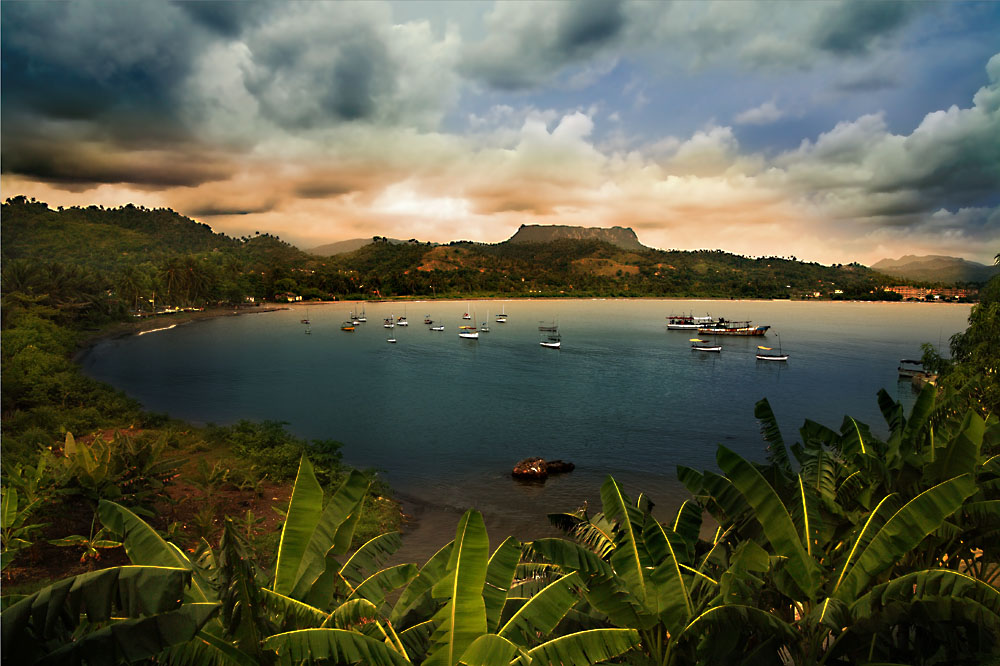
the Bay of Baracoa and El Yunque

El Yunque is a 575-metre-high (1,886 ft) mountain located 7 km (4.3 mi) west of Baracoa and the Baracoa Bay in Cuba's Guantanamo Province. It has a table mountain shape that resembles an anvil ("yunque" in Spanish).

== Overview ==
El Yunque was mentioned by Christopher Columbus in his chronicles about the discovery of the Americas. The Yunque is situated between the banks of the rivers Duaba and Toa, it is 1,125 m (3,691 ft) long and has a total area of 461,000 m^{2} (4,960,000 sq ft).

El Yunque was declared a National Monument by the Cuban National Commission of Monuments on December 25, 1979. El Yunque is covered with Cuban moist forests and the lower slopes are planted with cocoa bean under the shade of groves of royal palm.

== Gallery ==
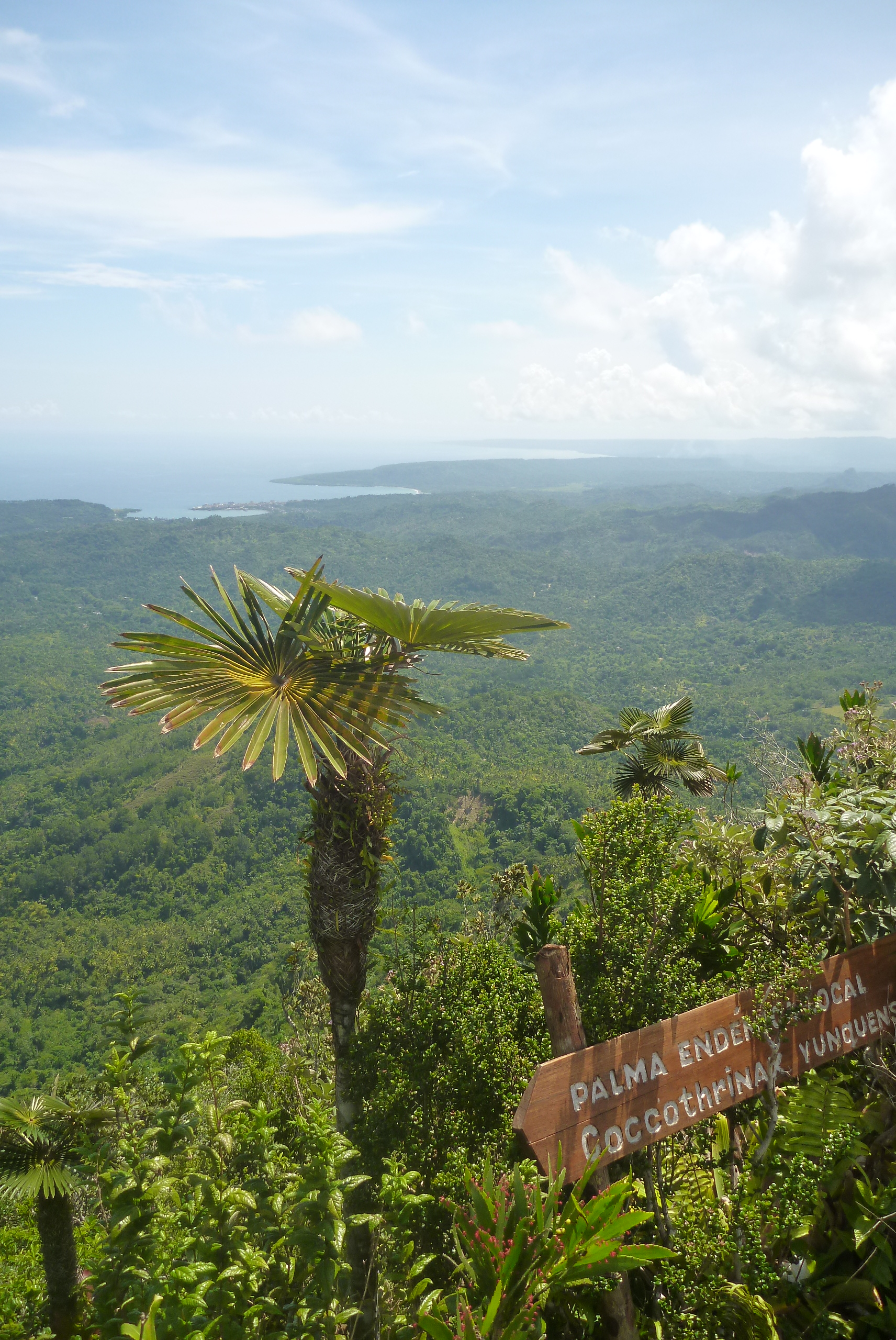
View from El Yunque

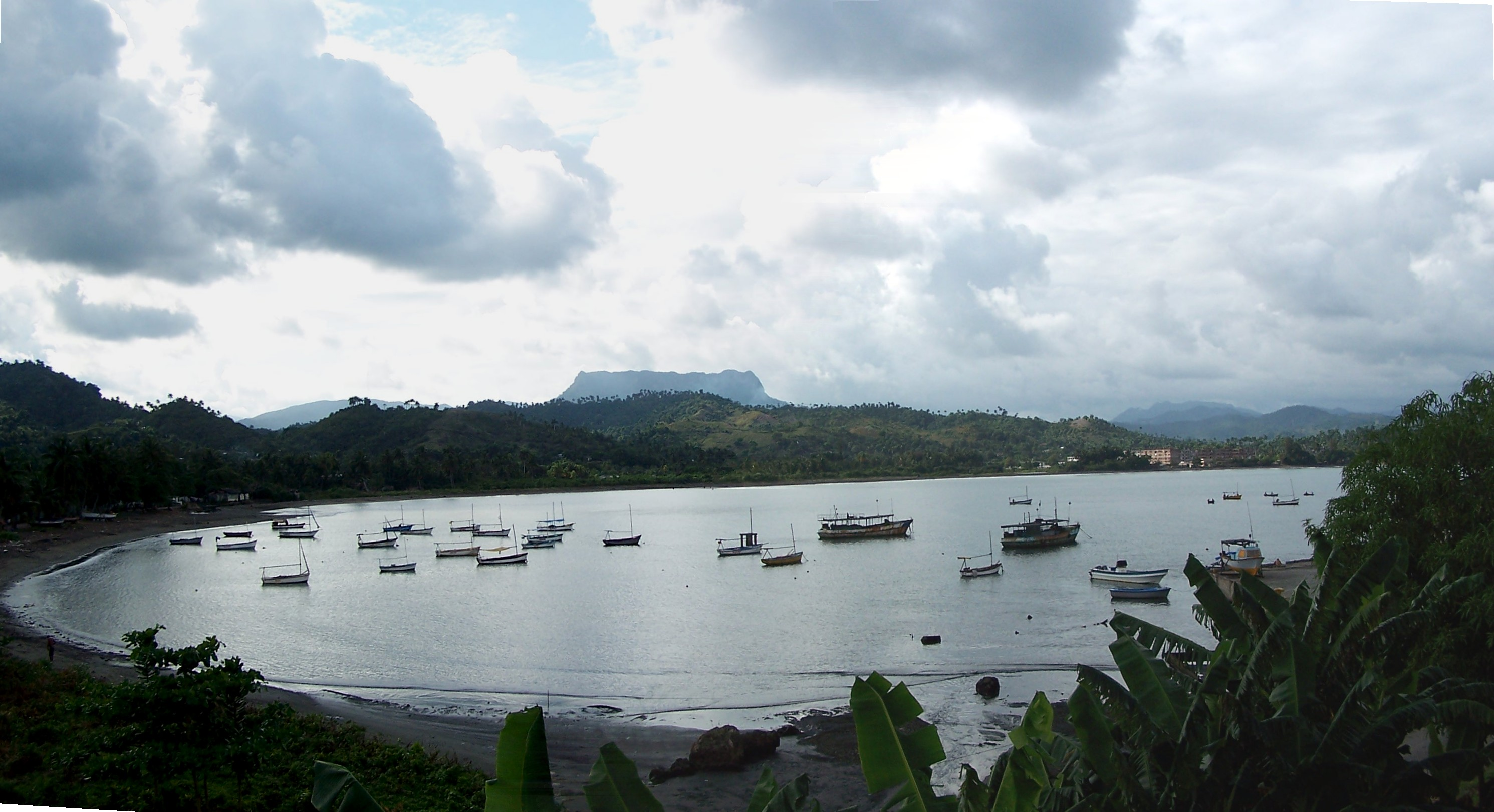
El Yunque from Baracoa bay

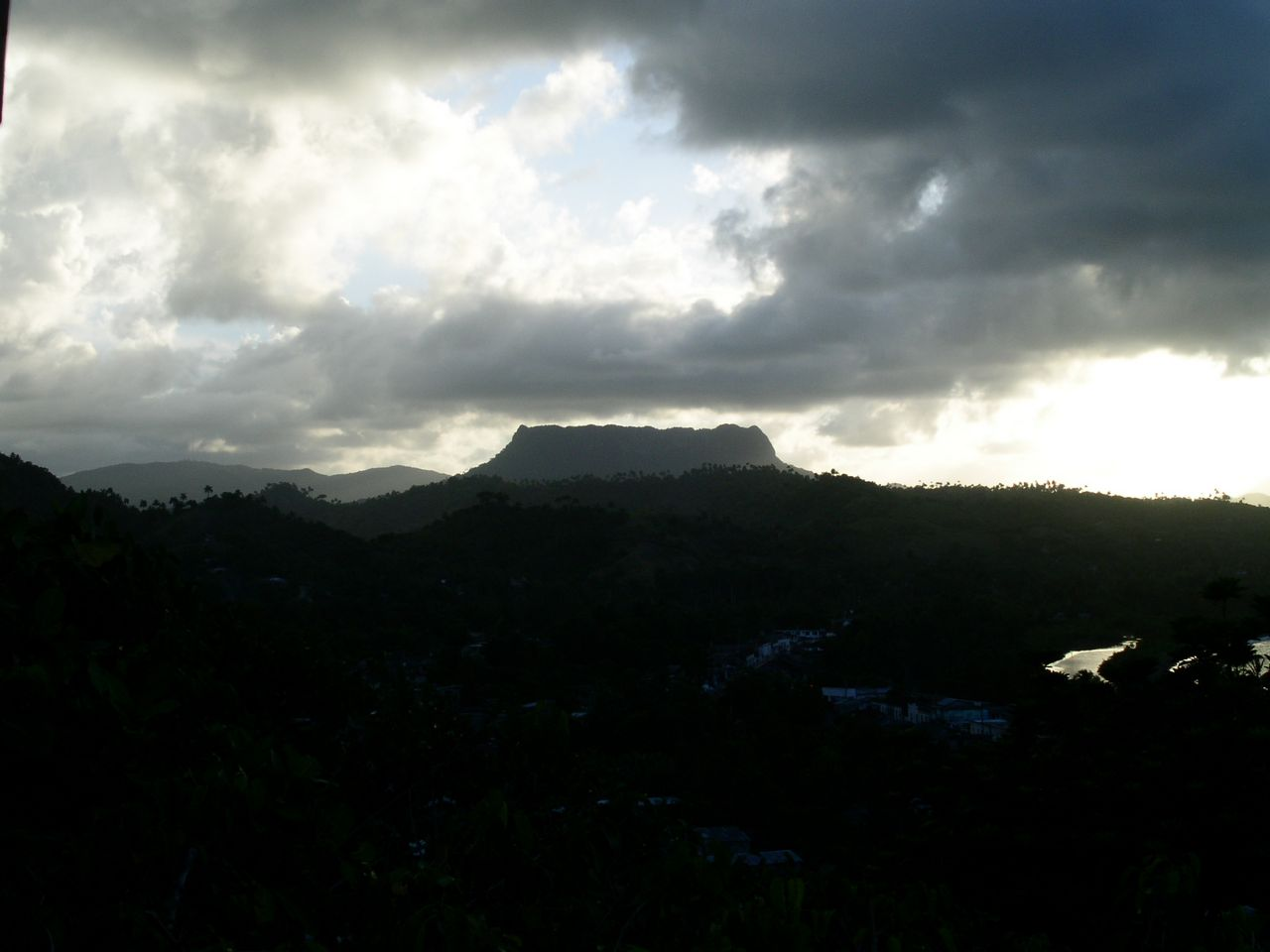
El Yunque in 2006

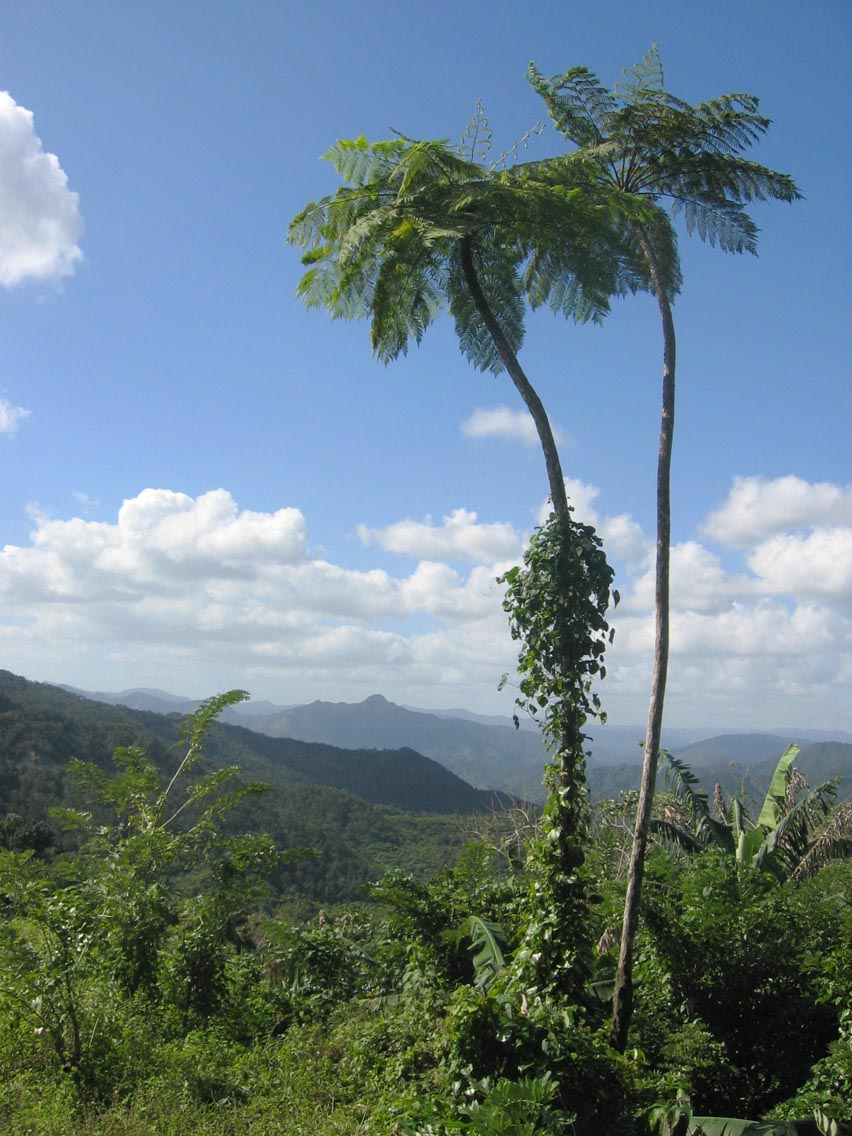
View to the west from the foot of El Yunque
