= Typhoon Chanchu =

Pacific typhoon in 2006

Typhoon Chanchu (Caloy)
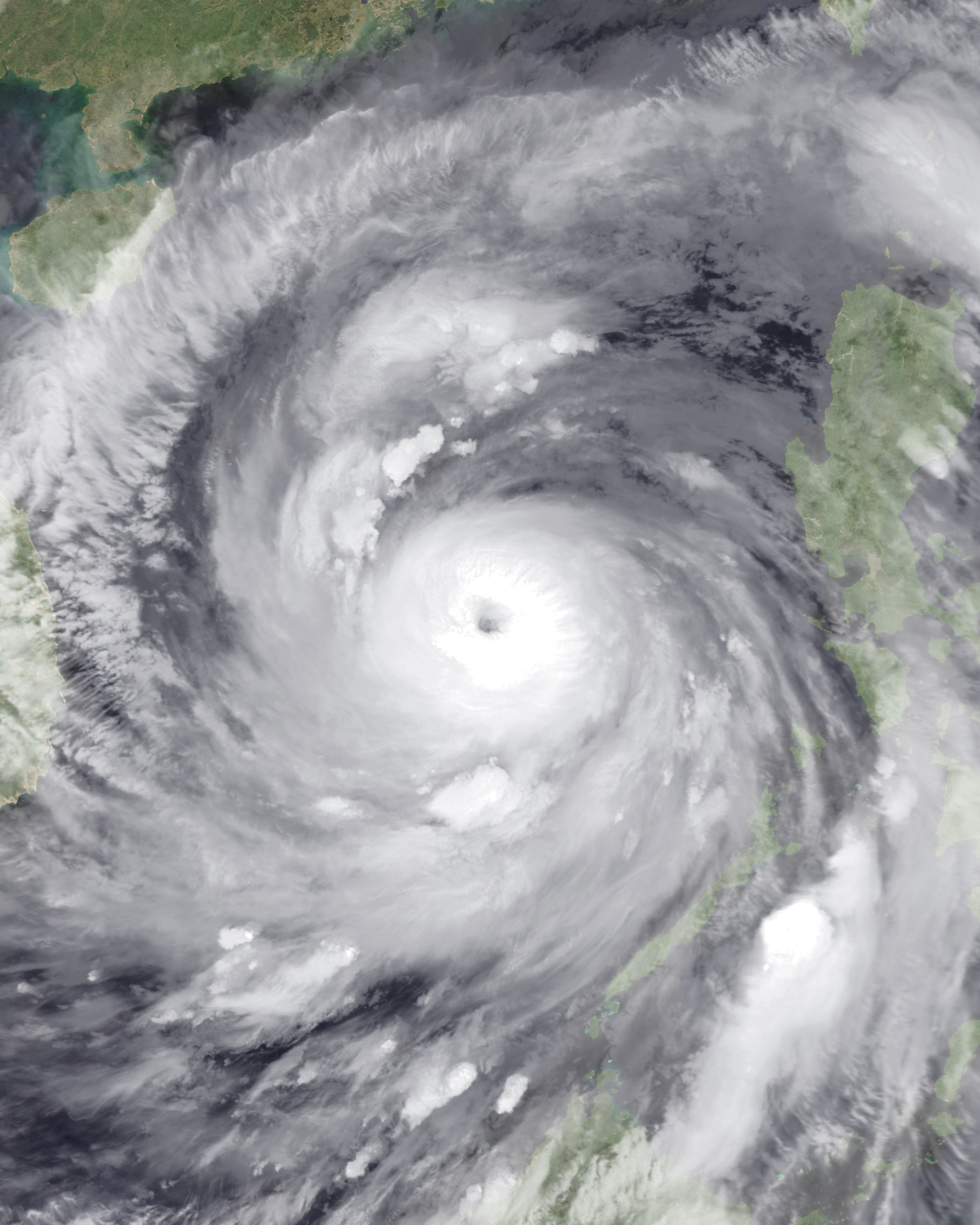
- Typhoon Chanchu near peak intensity on May 14

Meteorological history
- Formed: May 8, 2006
- Extratropical: May 19, 2006
- Dissipated: May 23, 2006

Very strong typhoon
- 10-minute sustained (JMA)
- Highest winds: 175 km/h (110 mph)
- Lowest pressure: 930 hPa (mbar); 27.46 inHg

Category 4-equivalent typhoon
- 1-minute sustained (SSHWS/JTWC)
- Highest winds: 230 km/h (145 mph)
- Lowest pressure: 916 hPa (mbar); 27.05 inHg

Overall effects
- Fatalities: 309 total
- Damage: $879 million (2006 USD)
- Areas affected: Philippines, coastal Vietnam, Taiwan, southeast China, Japan, South Korea
- IBTrACS
- Part of the 2006 Pacific typhoon season

Typhoon Chanchu, (Note: The name Chanchu (Cantonese: 珍珠, [t͡sɐn˥ t͡syː˥]) was contributed by Macau and means pearl in Cantonese.) known in the Philippines as Typhoon Caloy, was the most intense typhoon in the South China Sea in the month of May according to the Hong Kong Observatory (HKO). The first named storm of the 2006 Pacific typhoon season, Chanchu formed on May 8 in the vicinity of the Federated States of Micronesia and progressed westward. It gradually intensified into a tropical storm and later severe tropical storm before moving through the Philippines. On May 13, Chanchu entered the South China Sea and became a typhoon, according to the Japan Meteorological Agency (JMA).

Warm waters and favorable outflow allowed the storm to quickly intensify to peak maximum sustained winds of 175 km/h (109 mph) on May 15. Around that time, the typhoon turned sharply to the north toward southeastern China. Chanchu weakened as it curved to the northeast, making landfall near Shantou, Guangdong on May 17 as a severe tropical storm. The government of China considered Chanchu the earliest typhoon to make landfall in the province. On the next day, the storm emerged into the East China Sea, becoming extratropical on May 19 before dissipating west of Kyushu.

Early in its duration, Chanchu moved through the Philippines, causing power outages and landslides in several islands. Despite a general warning against small boats sailing, a ferry departed Masbate and capsized due to the storm, killing 28 people. Throughout the country, 41 people died, and damage reached ₱117.57 million (PHP, US$2.15 million). (Note: All damage totals are in 2006 values of their respective currencies.) While in the South China Sea, Chanchu caught many Vietnamese fisherman off guard, causing 17 ships to sink and damaging several others. Chinese ships assisted in the search-and-rescue mission, ultimately rescuing 330 fishermen from 22 boats; however, 21 bodies were found, and the remaining 220 missing were presumed killed. In southern China, flooding and strong winds from Chanchu wrecked about 14,000 houses and damaged over 190,000 ha (470,000 acres) of crop fields. Damage was heaviest in Shantou where it moved ashore, with flooding covering roads and entering hundreds of homes. Damage in China totaled ¥7 billion yuan (RMB, US$872 million), and there were 23 deaths. Rains from the typhoon killed two people in Taiwan after sweeping them up in a river, and crop damage there reached NT$158.88 million (NTD, US$5 million). Later, high waves killed one person in Okinawa and left another person missing, while rains extended into South Korea.

== Meteorological history ==
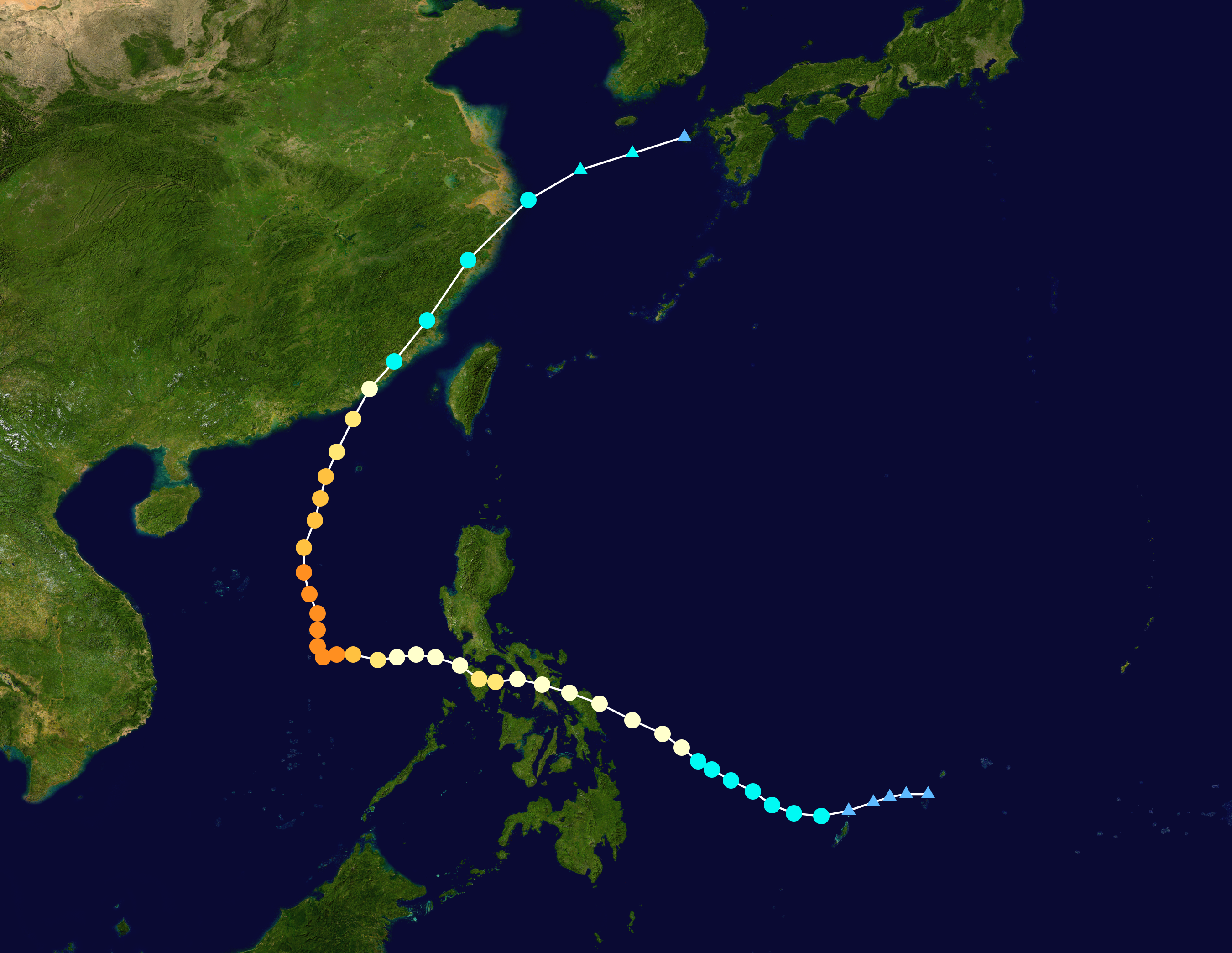
Map plotting the storm's track and intensity, according to the Saffir–Simpson scale Map key Saffir–Simpson scale Tropical depression (≤38 mph, ≤62 km/h) Tropical storm (39–73 mph, 63–118 km/h) Category 1 (74–95 mph, 119–153 km/h) Category 2 (96–110 mph, 154–177 km/h) Category 3 (111–129 mph, 178–208 km/h) Category 4 (130–156 mph, 209–251 km/h) Category 5 (≥157 mph, ≥252 km/h) Unknown Storm type Tropical cyclone Subtropical cyclone Extratropical cyclone, remnant low, tropical disturbance, or monsoon depression

An area of convection, or thunderstorms, persisted on May 5 southeast of Yap State in the Federated States of Micronesia (FSM). Initially it remained disorganized while tracking to the west, although a circulation became more distinct on May 7, indicative of gradual organization. At 06:00 UTC on May 8, the Japan Meteorological Agency (JMA) (Note: The Japan Meteorological Agency is the official Regional Specialized Meteorological Center for the western Pacific Ocean.) declared that a tropical depression had developed about 175 km (109 mi) northeast of Palau. Five hours later, the Joint Typhoon Warning Center (JTWC) (Note: The Joint Typhoon Warning Center is a joint United States Navy – United States Air Force task force that issues tropical cyclone warnings for the western Pacific Ocean and other regions.) issued a tropical cyclone formation alert, and at 18:00 UTC they classified the system as Tropical Depression 02W. The system moved to the west-southwest, influenced by the subtropical ridge to the north. Early on May 9, the JTWC upgraded the depression to tropical storm status, and at 12:00 UTC the JMA followed suit by upgrading the system to Tropical Storm Chanchu. Also on that day, the Philippine Atmospheric, Geophysical and Astronomical Services Administration (PAGASA) began issuing warnings on the storm as Tropical Storm Caloy.

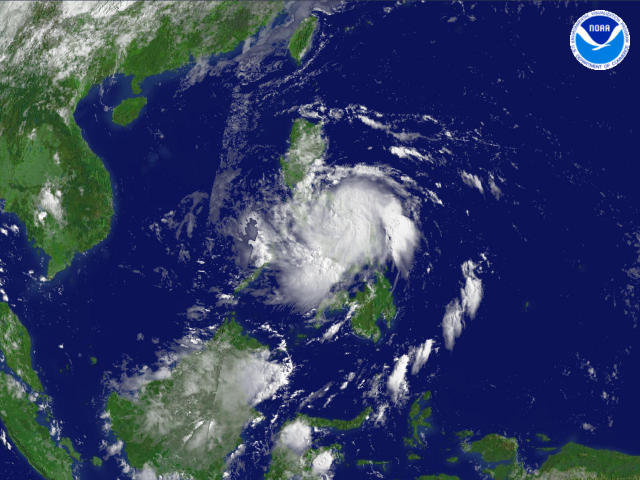
Severe Tropical Storm Chanchu near Samar on May 11

In its formative stages, Chanchu was located in an environment generally favorable for intensification. Its tracked shifted more to the west-northwest due to a building ridge to the south. Late on May 10, the JTWC upgraded Chanchu to typhoon status, estimating 1 minute sustained winds of 140 km/h (87 mph). By contrast, the JMA estimated it intensified only into a severe tropical storm with winds of 95 km/h (59 mph). Turning more to the west, Chanchu made landfall on Samar in the eastern Philippines on May 11. Despite moving through the archipelago, Chanchu intensified slightly within the Sibuyan Sea, striking Mindoro on May 12 with 1 minute winds of 160 km/h (99 mph), according to the JTWC. On May 13, Chanchu emerged into the South China Sea, and later that day the JMA upgraded it to typhoon status.

Upon reaching the South China Sea, Chanchu encountered an area of warm sea surface temperatures and low wind shear. After an upper-level low to the east provided favorable outflow to the south and the east, Chanchu rapidly intensified on May 14. While the storm was active, the JTWC upgraded Chanchu to a super typhoon with peak 1 minute winds of 250 km/h (160 mph), although the agency later downgraded the peak winds to 230 km/h (140 mph). By contrast, the JMA estimated peak 10 minute winds of 175 km/h (109 mph) at 00:00 UTC on May 15. According to the Hong Kong Observatory, the 10 minute winds reached 185 km/h (115 mph), which made Chanchu the strongest typhoon in the South China Sea in the month of May.

By the time Chanchu attained peak winds, an eastward-moving trough over China broke up the ridge to the north, causing the typhoon to turn sharply to the north into a less favorable environment. With decreased outflow and stronger wind shear, Chanchu began slowly weakening. The eye initially remained small, but the outer eyewall deteriorated on May 16 as the convection decreased in the northern periphery. The trough that previously weakened the ridge steered Chanchu to the north-northeast and forced an extratropical transition. Late on May 17, the JMA downgraded the typhoon to a severe tropical storm. Around that time, Chanchu made landfall near Shantou, Guangdong in southeastern China, about 315 km (196 mi) east of Hong Kong; the JTWC estimated landfall winds of 130 km/h (81 mph), while the JMA estimated them at 110 km/h (68 mph). Early on May 18, the JTWC discontinued advisories, although the JMA continued tracking Chanchu over southeastern China through eastern Fujian province. Later on May 18, the storm emerged into the East China Sea, becoming fully extratropical at 00:00 UTC on May 19. The remnants continued toward Japan before dissipating at 18:00 UTC that day off the west coast of Kyushu in southern Japan.

== Preparations ==
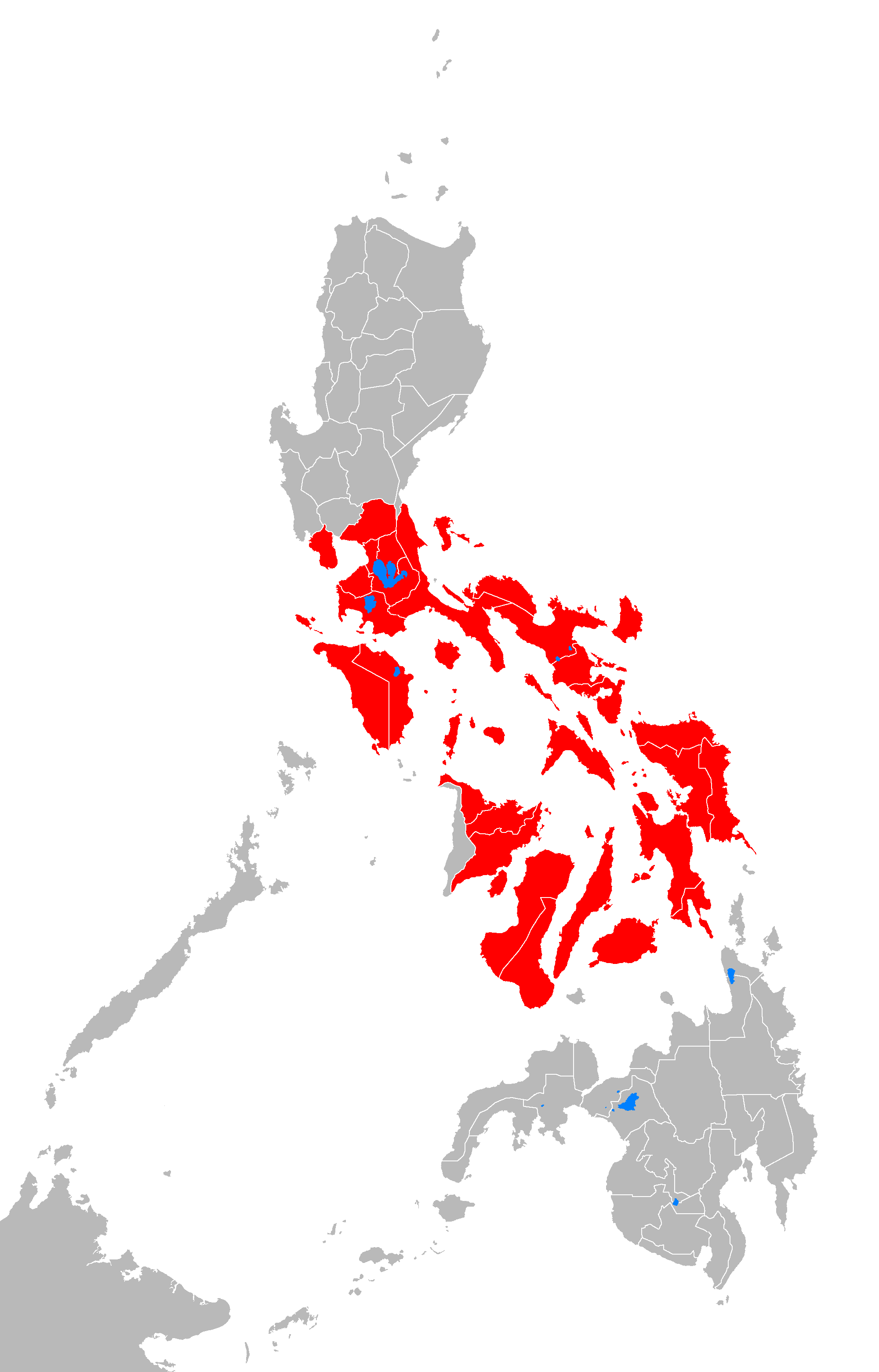
Philippine provinces where public storm signals were raised

Officials in southern Leyte recommended that residents evacuate to prevent a repeat of a deadly landslide in February 2006. Officials canceled several flights and ferry lines, stranding 10,000 people. In all, 2,144 people evacuated in the Philippines. PAGASA issued a storm signal number 2 for several provinces along Chanchu's path, as well as storm signal number 1 for other areas, largely forecasting for rainfall and gusty winds.

Vietnamese fishermen in the South China Sea received 24 hours of warning from the National Hydrometerological Forecast Center before Chanchu approached the area, less time than other agencies in the region. At one point, Chanchu was forecast to become a strong typhoon and make landfall near Hong Kong. In response to the threat, officials at the Hong Kong Observatory, as well as in Macau, issued a standby signal to inform the public of the approaching typhoon. The HKO issued a warning signal number 3 on May 17. In the territory, 60 flights were canceled with another 14 delayed, beaches were closed, and ferry service was disrupted. Ahead of the storm, about 1 million people evacuated from coastal Guangdong and Fujian provinces to government warehouses, schools, tents, or the houses of relatives. In the former province, 62,000 fishermen were ordered to return to port, while four flights were canceled at Guangzhou Baiyun International Airport. Residents were advised to remain indoors, and workers reinforced billboards in anticipation of the strong winds. Rail and boat transport was stopped between Guangdong and Hainan across the Qiongzhou Strait due to the typhoon. Schools were closed in Guangdong during the storm's passage, although they remained open in Fujian. In Shanghai, the speed limit of Donghai Bridge was halved because of strong winds.

Ahead of the storm, the Central Weather Bureau in Taiwan issued land and sea warnings. The Tainan City Government and three county governments closed for one day. All domestic flights to offshore islands were canceled, and rail service was interrupted. Later, airlines canceled 12 flights in Japan due to the storm.

== Impact ==
=== The Philippines and Malaysia ===
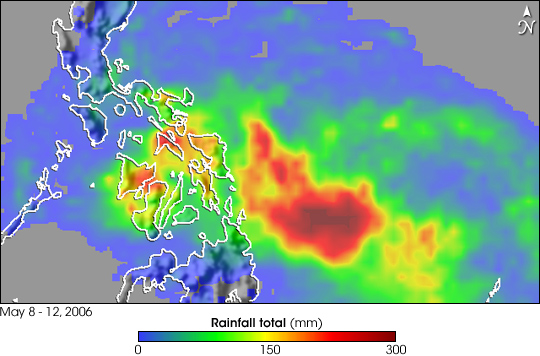
Rainfall from Chanchu up to May 12

While moving through the Philippines, Chanchu affected several islands with strong winds and heavy rainfall. In Legazpi, Albay, strong waves wrecked 100 homes and left 1,500 people homeless. High winds left widespread power outages, particularly in Mindoro, Batangas, and across the Bicol Region. The storm severely damaged the banana industry and affected various other fruit crops. Near Metro Manila, the winds damaged billboards, knocked over trees, and caused isolated power outages. Rough seas sank a ferry off Masbate, despite a warning against the operation of small craft, having left at sunrise to avoid the police. The Coast Guard rescued 18 passengers, but 28 people died in the wreck. An empty ferry sank at port in Tabaco. A ferry with 700 people aboard went missing, but the Coast Guard found it washed ashore with everyone safe on board. Similarly, an oil tanker washed ashore at Pinamalayan, Oriental Mindoro, and its crew of 13 was rescued. Throughout the country, Chanchu killed 41 people, mostly from the Masbate ferry wreck. The storm damaged 5,630 homes, and destroyed 1,013 others, forcing 53,307 people to leave their homes. Agricultural losses totaled ₱71.57 million (PHP, US$1.3 million), (Note: The total was originally reported in Philippine pesos. Total converted via the Oanda Corporation website.) chiefly to the corn harvest, with an additional ₱46 million (PHP, US$850,000) in infrastructure damage.

While stalled over the South China Sea, Chanchu's large circulation caused an increase in rainfall over Malaysia. The typhoon brought the onset of the summer monsoon in the South China Sea after shifting the prevailing winds over the region.

=== Vietnam ===
While moving slowly through the South China Sea, Chanchu produced strong waves that struck the east coast of Vietnam. The associated flooding washed away many shrimp from coastal ponds and also entered Thu Bồn River, thus preventing its use as a source for irrigation for about 1,000 ha (2,500 acres) of rice paddy fields. Due to its unexpected change in course and ferocity, Chanchu caught dozens of ships off guard and damaged communications, sinking 17 ships and damaging several others. Initially, there were 400 fishermen missing, although there was conflicting information with regard to the number of ships and people affected, particularly with ships near Hainan or Taiwan. Following a request from the Vietnamese government, the Chinese government deployed rescue ships on May 19, a day after the storm made its final landfall. Offshore Quảng Ngãi Province, 94 fishermen sought refuge on a Chinese island, and 22 boats were found on Pratas Island (Tungsha/Dongsha), Taiwan (ROC). One Chinese ship rescued 97 fishermen, but also found 18 people killed. Chinese ships ultimately rescued 330 fishermen from 22 boats and provided them with food and water; this was the country's largest oceanic rescue at the time. Two Vietnamese boats departed from Quảng Ngãi to assist crews on damaged boats attempting to return to port. Medical teams greeted the ships returning to harbor, while an altar was set up for the deceased. After two weeks, the government of Vietnam ended the search, with 21 bodies found, and the remaining 220 missing fishermen presumed killed.

=== China ===
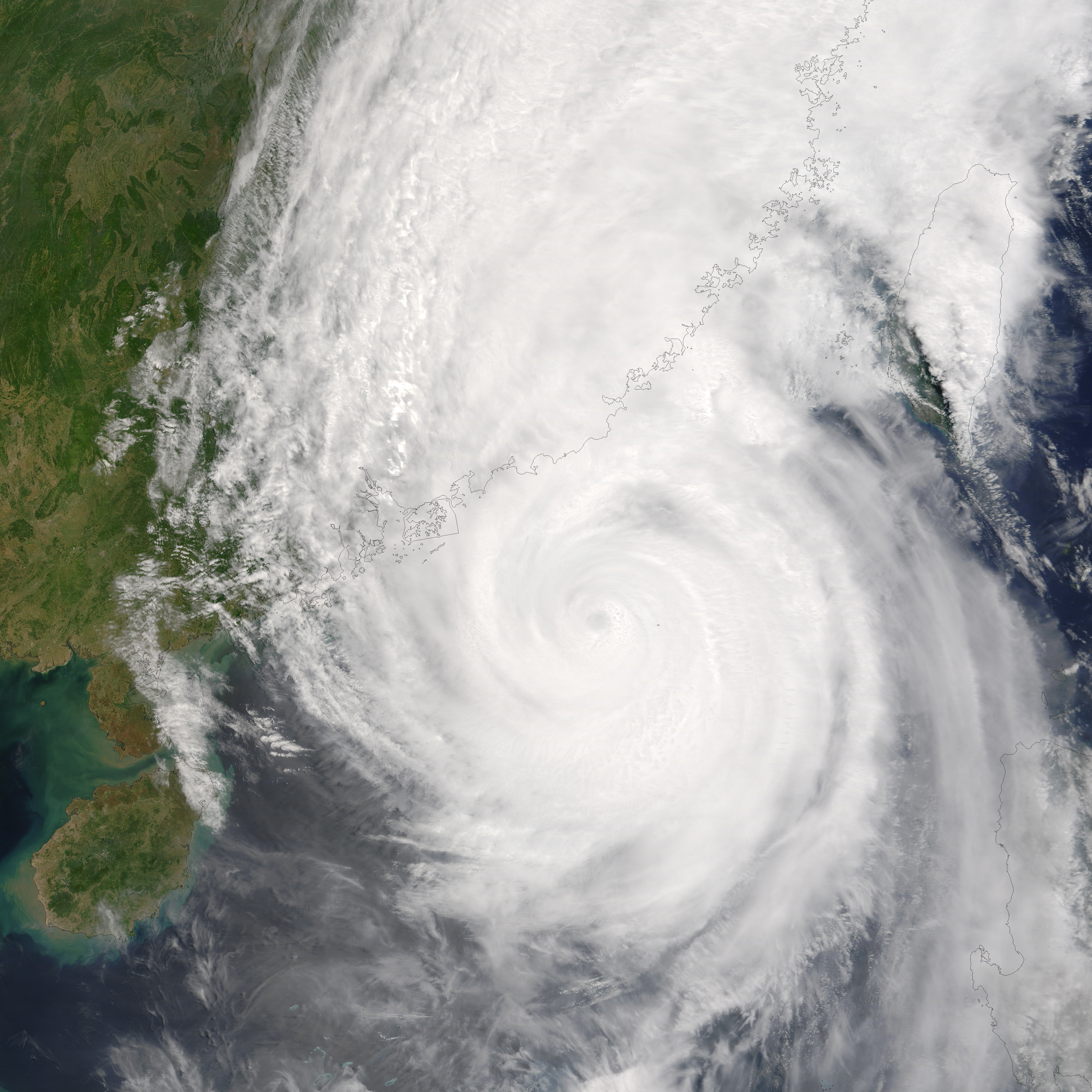
Typhoon Chanchu approaching Southeastern China on May 17

Typhoon Chanchu was the earliest on record to strike Guangdong at the time, having struck the country 44 days earlier than the average date for the first strike. Rainfall in the country spread across Guangdong, Fujian, Jiangxi, and Zhejiang, and Chanchu became the earliest typhoon to affect Shanghai in 80 years. Rainfall totaled over 250 mm (9.8 in) in southeastern Guangdong and southwestern Fujian. In the former province, wind gusts peaked at 170 km/h (110 mph) in Huilai.

Upon striking China, Chanchu produced deadly flooding and landslides along its path, with flooding spreading as far northeast as Zhejiang province. One landslide in Fujian killed eight people and wrecked two houses. In Guangdong and Fujian, Chanchu wrecked 14,000 houses and damaged over 190,000 hectares (470,000 acres) of crop fields. Damage was particularly heavy in Shantou, Guangdong, where Chanchu moved ashore. There were about 200 flooded houses, and many roads covered, after rivers flooded from the heavy rainfall. The storm also caused power outages in Shantou, and damage there totaled ¥2.56 billion yuan (RMB, US$320 million). In nearby Xiamen, the typhoon forced 43 factories to temporarily close, resulting in a loss of ¥62.2 million yuan (RMB, US$7.8 million). (Note: The total was originally reported in Chinese yuan. Total converted via the Oanda Corporation website.) The storm killed eight people in Guangdong, five of them due to traffic accidents, and a further 15 in Fujian. Overall damage was estimated at ¥7 billion yuan (RMB, US$872 million), roughly evenly split between Guangdong and Fujian. This was less than expected given the winds at landfall.

While passing east of Hong Kong, the outer rainbands of Chanchu dropped 43.5 mm (1.71 in) of rainfall at Sha Tin. Sustained winds in the territory reached 96 km/h (60 mph), while gusts reached 146 km/h (91 mph), both recorded at Tate's Cairn. Chanchu produced a storm surge of 0.77 m (2.5 ft), causing minor flooding, sinking a yacht, and injuring one person who was swept into the sea. The storm downed several trees and damaged some scaffolding. Six people were injured in the territory, including three on a jetfoil bound for Macau.

=== Taiwan, Japan, and South Korea ===
High waves in Taiwan washed an oil tanker ashore in Kaohsiung City; all 13 crew members were rescued with helicopters. In Kaohsiung County, the typhoon wrecked several dikes in coastal cities. Chanchu also produced heavy rainfall on the island, causing flooding and landslides, the latter of which covered a highway. Swollen rivers swept away three farmers in Hualien County, who were later rescued, and killed two sisters in Pingtung County underneath the Sandimen Bridge.

In Nishihara, Okinawa, high waves caused by Chanchu swept away three bathers. The Japan Coast Guard rescued one, another was killed, and the third remained missing as of May 23. The remnants of Chanchu produced 121 mm (4.8 in) of rainfall in Gifu Prefecture in combination with a nearby cold front, causing one landslide. A fallen tree in Nagasaki Prefecture caused a small power outage, and nearby there was a damaged home.

The trough that engulfed Chanchu drew moisture from the typhoon, leading to heavy rainfall in portions of South Korea that reached 144 mm (5.7 in) on Jeju Island. Along with strong winds, the rains caused ferry and flight cancelations.

== Aftermath ==
In the days after Chanchu moved through the Philippines, then-President Gloria Macapagal Arroyo ordered that the country's National Disaster Coordinating Council help all towns affected by the storm. The agency helped coordinate search and rescue missions. Several areas were declared a state of calamity, mostly on Mindoro, Samar, and Batangas. The Tzu Chi Foundation visited islands in eastern Samar, providing money to the families whose houses were destroyed. Towns in the region also assisted by supplying thatch to rebuild homes. In Oriental Mindoro, the Philippine Red Cross provided food and relief items to families in Calapan. The Adventist Development and Relief Agency also provided building materials for 200 families in Mindoro. Ultimately, the government provided storm victims with ₱415.1 million (PHP, US$7.6 million) worth of relief supplies. Rainfall from the storm caused a red tide in Taal Lake, after dispersing a Ceratium bloom.

Immediate after Chanchu's China landfall, officials began distributing tents, quilts, water purification tablets, and disinfectant. The government of Fujian set up a ¥8.5 million yuan (RMB, $1.06 million) relief fund. In the months after Chanchu, China suffered from several other damaging tropical cyclones, including Tropical Storm Bilis and Typhoon Saomai. Damage from Chanchu forced the China National Offshore Oil Corporation to shut down for a time, which contributed to an annual decrease in its oil output. The Chinese government recognized 50 people who assisted in the South China Sea search and rescue mission, and two vessels were declared "hero ships".

Vietnamese president Trần Đức Lương expressed his thanks to the Chinese government on May 22 for rescuing the Vietnamese on the imperiled ships. Residents and industries in Vietnam raised ₫360 million (VND, US$36,000) (Note: The total was originally reported in Vietnamese đồng. Total converted via the Oanda Corporation website.) for the families of the deceased fishermen, as well as providing 1 ton of rice. Trade unions encouraged workers to donate one day's salary to help storm victims. The Vietnamese embassy in India raised about US$1,000 and Vietnamese people living in Greece raised ₫26 million (VND, €1,300 Euros) for storm victims. Ultimately, 43 different organizations and people donated $29,000 (USD) to the Vietnam Red Cross. The country's Ministry of Labour, Invalids and Social Affairs presented an award to the Vietnam News Agency in June 2006 for its charitable donations, which included the distribution of ₫112 million (VND, US$11,200) to storm victims. One fisherman claimed to survive for two weeks in the open seas before being rescued, although he later confessed that he was safely on another boat, and wanted his family to retain the disaster compensation; after the man revealed that he had lied, his family was able to retain the relief funds due to their poverty. The head of the Vietnam Institute of Meteorology, Hydrology and Environment resigned two weeks after Chanchu killed many fishermen because of inadequate warnings. Then-Deputy Prime Minister Nguyễn Tấn Dũng ordered a review of the meteorological agency as a result. Within a few years after the typhoon, the meteorological agency began issuing more accurate and timely forecasts. After the many deaths of fishermen from Chanchu, the Vietnam government prevented any fishermen from leaving harbor during the passage of Typhoon Durian in November.

After the season ended, members of the 39th meeting of the Typhoon Committee of the World Meteorological Organization met in Manila in December 2006. They discussed retiring the name "Chanchu", along with four other names from the season. During the 40th meeting in November 2007, the Typhoon Committee approved the retirement, announcing that the name "Sanba" would replace Chanchu on the basin name lists beginning in 2008.

== See also ==
- Typhoons in the Philippines
- Other typhoons that impacted the Philippines in 2006:
  - Typhoon Xangsane
  - Typhoon Cimaron
  - Typhoon Chebi
  - Typhoon Durian
  - Typhoon Utor
- Typhoon Megi (2010) – Stronger storm that took a similar track through the Philippines before turning north and striking China
- Typhoon Kammuri (2019) – A late-season powerful Category 4 typhoon that struck almost the same areas throughout its path in the Philippines. Also had a similar track and intensity.
- Typhoon Molave and Goni (2020) – A pair of typhoons that both devastated Bicol Region with the latter one became the strongest landfall on record.
