= Typhoon Utor (2006) =

Pacific typhoon in 2006

Typhoon Utor (Seniang)
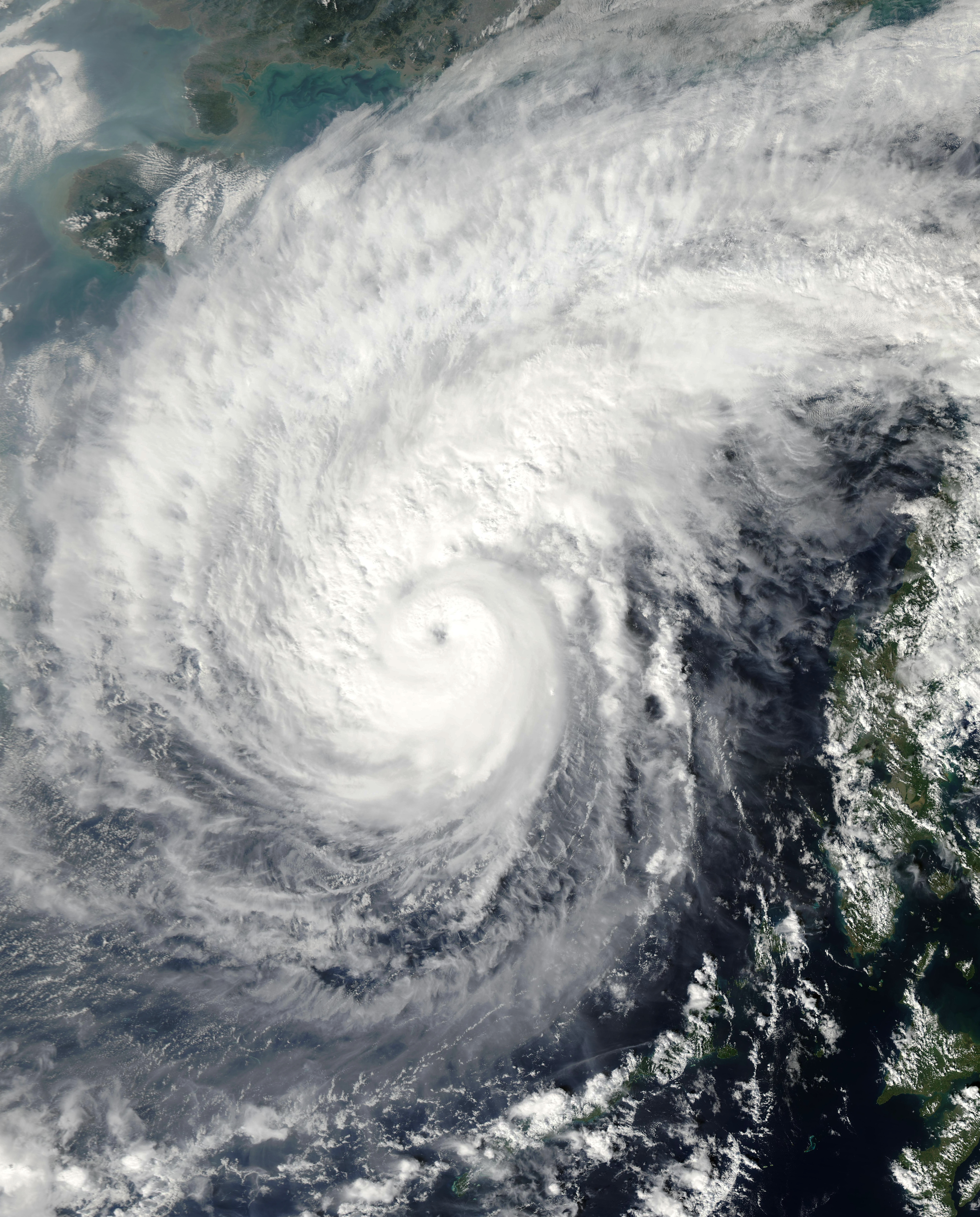
- Utor shortly before peak intensity on December 12

Meteorological history
- Formed: December 7, 2006
- Dissipated: December 15, 2006

Very strong typhoon
- 10-minute sustained (JMA)
- Highest winds: 155 km/h (100 mph)
- Lowest pressure: 945 hPa (mbar); 27.91 inHg

Category 3-equivalent typhoon
- 1-minute sustained (SSHWS/JTWC)
- Highest winds: 185 km/h (115 mph)
- Lowest pressure: 944 hPa (mbar); 27.88 inHg

Overall effects
- Fatalities: 38 total
- Damage: $15.8 million (2006 USD)
- Areas affected: Philippines, Paracel Islands, Malaysia
- IBTrACS
- Part of the 2006 Pacific typhoon season

Typhoon Utor, (Note: The name Utor (Marshallese: uto̧r, [wudˠɒrʷ]) was contributed by the United States and means squall line in Marshallese.) known in the Philippines as Typhoon Seniang, swept through the central Philippines in early December 2006, exacerbating the damage left behind by previous Philippine typhoon strikes that year. Residual moisture from the tropical cyclone indirectly contributed to extensive flooding in Malaysia. Utor originated from an area of disturbed weather that organized into a tropical depression on December 7 west-southwest of Yap.

The cyclone steadily progressed westward while gradually intensifying, reaching tropical storm intensity late on December 7. On December 9 and the ensuing two days, Utor crossed the central Philippines and reached typhoon strength before weakening somewhat upon entry into the South China Sea. Reintensification ensued afterwards, and Utor reached its peak intensity on December 13 with maximum sustained winds of 155 km/h (100 mph) shortly after regaining typhoon strength. (Note: Sustained is measured or estimated as the average of wind velocities at any one location over a ten-minute period unless otherwise noted.) However, wind shear and dry air began to take its toll on Utor thereafter, quickly weakening the storm until its dissipation on December 15.

Due to the destruction wrought by Typhoon Durian just weeks prior, preparations began in earnest in the Philippines. Over 91,000 people were evacuated from areas at risk, primarily from Albay. Two major summits to be held in Cebu were postponed as a result of the forecast inclement weather. In addition, recovery efforts for victims of Durian had to be suspended and all domestic flights in the Philippines were cancelled. Utor's impacts in the central Philippines were extensive, with 30 casualties reported and the damage toll reaching US$15.8 million. Widespread power outages affected the entirety of Eastern Visayas. Numerous ships sunk as a result of rough seas generated by the typhoon, including a ferry carrying 104 passengers and crew. Following the storm, relief agencies began to allocate resources to those affected by the typhoon, in turn also adding to relief efforts for the three Philippine typhoons which preceded Utor. Precautionary efforts also took place in Vietnam, Thailand, and Malaysia, while the Paracel Islands sustained marked damage but no fatalities. Although the storm mostly dissipated in the South China Sea, Utor's remnant moisture later contributed in part to Peninsular Malaysia's worst flood event in recorded history, as copious amounts of precipitation fell over a short, four-day period. Eight people were killed by the floods which were worst in Kota Tinggi and Segamat District.

== Meteorological history ==
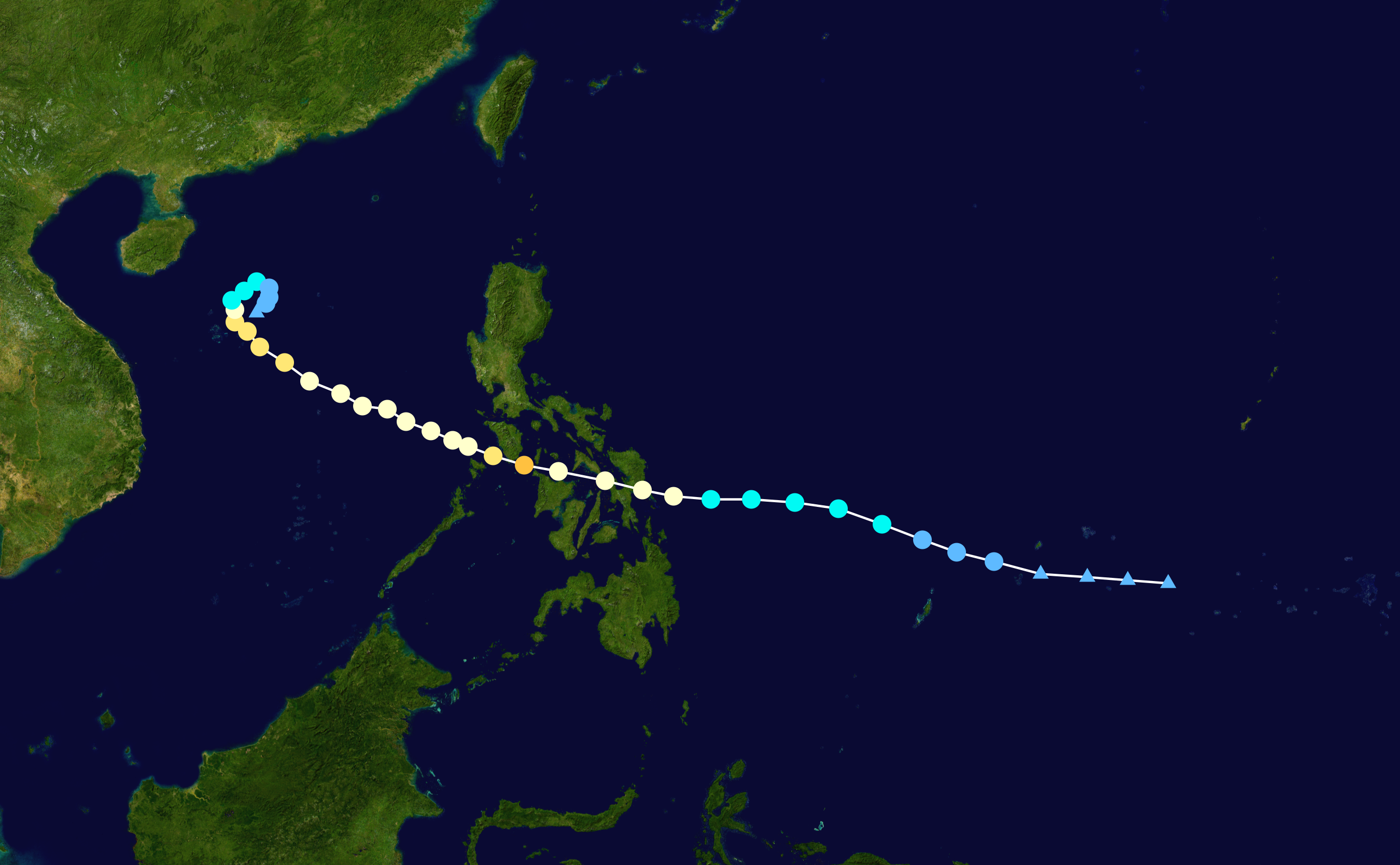
Map plotting the storm's track and intensity, according to the Saffir–Simpson scale Map key Saffir–Simpson scale Tropical depression (≤38 mph, ≤62 km/h) Tropical storm (39–73 mph, 63–118 km/h) Category 1 (74–95 mph, 119–153 km/h) Category 2 (96–110 mph, 154–177 km/h) Category 3 (111–129 mph, 178–208 km/h) Category 4 (130–156 mph, 209–251 km/h) Category 5 (≥157 mph, ≥252 km/h) Unknown Storm type Tropical cyclone Subtropical cyclone Extratropical cyclone, remnant low, tropical disturbance, or monsoon depression

The predecessor to Typhoon Utor was first noted by the Joint Typhoon Warning Center (JTWC) as a cluster of thunderstorms southeast of Chuuk on December 2. (Note: The Joint Typhoon Warning Center is a joint United States Navy – United States Air Force task force that issues tropical cyclone warnings for the western Pacific Ocean and other regions.) Over the next few days, a center of circulation accompanied by intermittent shower activity began to develop in the presence of favorable conditions. At 00:00 UTC on December 7, the Japan Meteorological Agency (JMA) determined that the disturbance had become sufficiently organized to be considered a tropical depression; (Note: The Japan Meteorological Agency is the official Regional Specialized Meteorological Center for the western Pacific Ocean.) at the time the cyclone was centered 175 km (110 mi) west-southwest of Yap. Tracking westward under the influence of a powerful subtropical ridge to its north, the depression strengthened into a tropical storm at 18:00 UTC, given the name Utor.

Utor's development following its naming was slow, but quickened as the tropical storm neared the Philippines. The tropical cyclone reached the southeastern coast of Samar by 06:00 UTC on December 9 and began tracking through the central Philippine archipelago over the next two days. Despite its interaction with the nearby islands, Utor continued to strengthen without much impediment and reached typhoon strength in the Visayan Sea at 12:00 UTC that day. Twelve hours later, the typhoon attained an initial peak intensity with maximum sustained winds of 140 km/h (85 mph) and a minimum barometric pressure of 955 mbar (hPa; 28.20 inHg) in the Sibuyan Sea according to the JMA. The JTWC analyzed an intensity of (185 km/h) 115 mph at that time. By 12:00 UTC on December 10, Utor had emerged into the South China Sea.

Although Utor tracked back over water on December 10, the storm began to weaken due to increasing wind shear and dry air from the west. As a result, the JMA downgraded Utor to severe tropical storm intensity upon its emergence into the South China Sea. Despite these hindering conditions, the storm's improved outflow was sufficient to enable redevelopment. At 18:00 UTC on December 11, the JMA once again upgraded the system to typhoon strength southeast of Hainan. Intensification continued until Utor peaked with winds of 155 km/h (100 mph) and a minimum pressure of 945 mbar (hPa; 27.91 inHg) the next day. This strength was held for only twelve hours before Utor's outflow began to succumb to the wind shear and dry air stemming from the monsoonal flow it had previously suppressed. Traveling in a tight clockwise loop, the typhoon rapidly weakened on December 13; by the following day Utor was a minimal tropical storm. At 06:00 UTC on December 14, the storm degenerated into a tropical depression and continued to execute a small anticyclonic loop before dissipating on December 15.

== Preparations, impact, and aftermath ==
=== Philippines ===
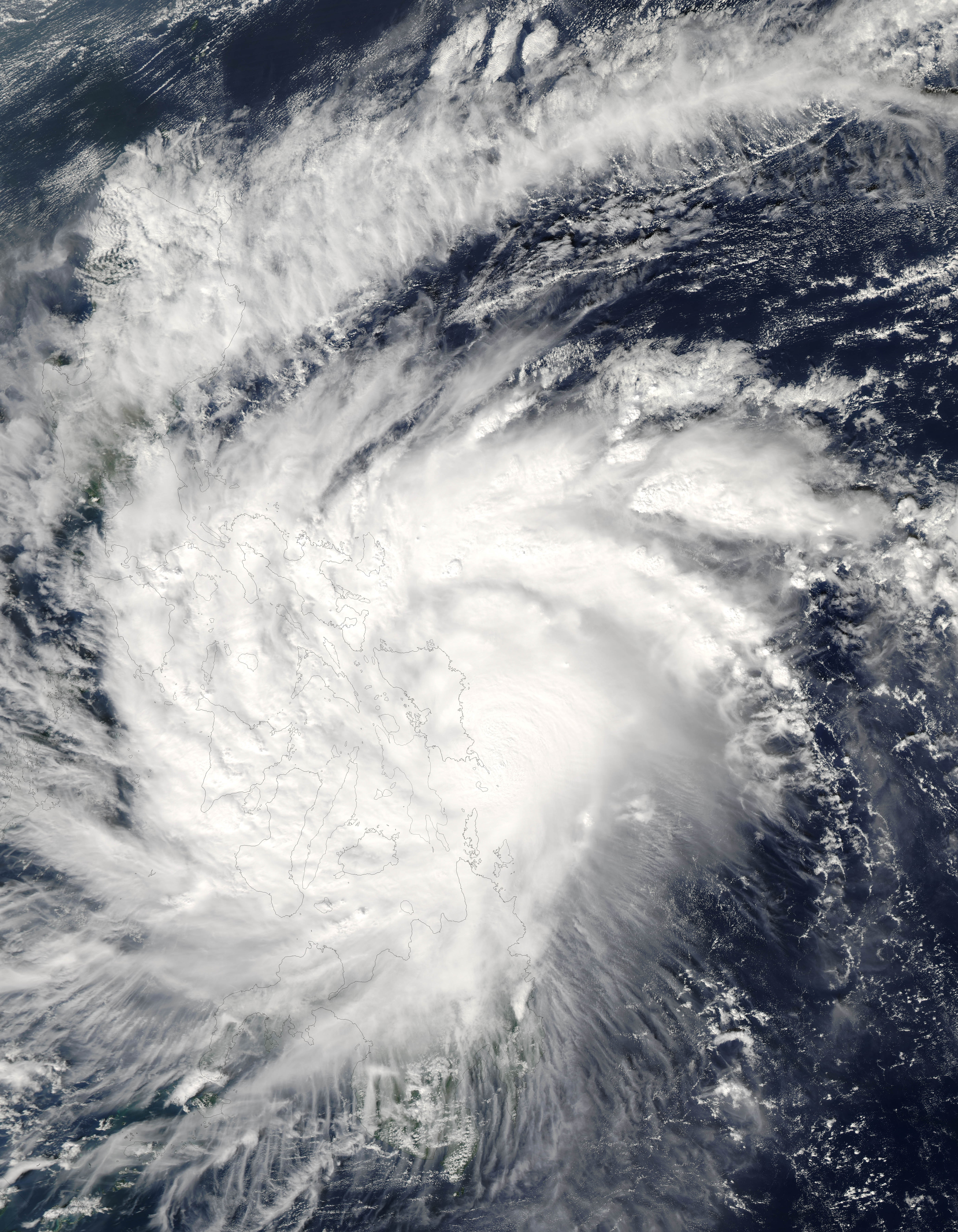
Tropical Storm Utor making landfall in the Philippines on December 9

Although the Philippine Atmospheric, Geophysical and Astronomical Services Administration (PAGASA) did not recommend their delay, both the 2006 ASEAN and East Asia summits in Cebu City were postponed due to the threat of Utor impacting the city; officials denied allegations that the postponements were instead due to a possible terrorist attack. This was the first time than an ASEAN summit had been postponed due to inclement weather. Potentially hazardous conditions also delayed humanitarian aid to victims of Typhoon Durian, which struck the Philippines in late November. The first Public Storm Warning Signals for the Philippines were issued by the PAGASA on December 8 for several islands in the central Philippines. The third level of the four-tier warning system was issued for Samar, Leyte, and Biliran. With landfall imminent on December 9, 15,000 people were evacuated to temporary evacuation shelters from around 12 villages. This figure increased to 59,000 people as landfall occurred and later to 91,121 with the storm passing over the Philippines. Most of the evacuees were from Albay due to fears of deadly mudslides and lahars associated with Mount Mayon as witnessed during Typhoon Durian. In addition, the Philippines Office of Civil Defense considered relocating Typhoon Durian refugees in the Bicol Region to special "holding areas". Other domestic flights were also cancelled.

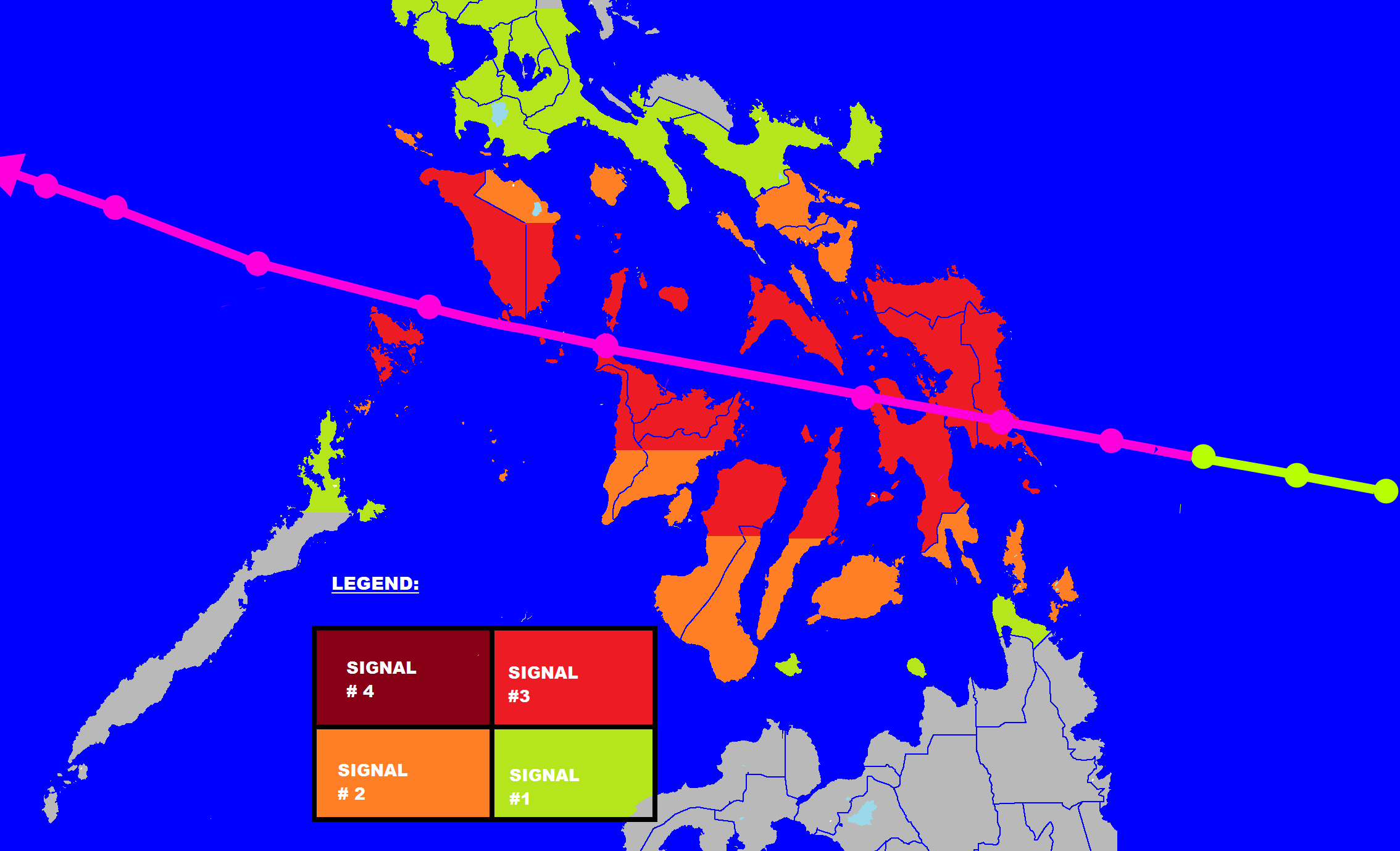
Map of the highest Public Storm Warning Signals by province raised by the PAGASA due to Utor

Utor caused extensive power outages in Cebu, Leyte, and Boracay, resulting in widespread loss of telecommunication. A single electric pole in northern Cebu caught fire during the storm, cutting out power to eight peripheral towns. Downtown Tacloban also suffered a blackout. Off of Boracay, a boat operator was killed after their ship capsized. Another 67 ships, which consisted of speedboats and ferries, sunk during the storm's passage. Buildings were unroofed and trees were torn apart on the island, littering its beaches with debris. A barge was forced by large waves into the pier at San Agustin, Romblon, resulting in the spilling of 25,000 L (6,600 gal) of diesel fuel. Two children were killed in Tacloban and Capiz as a result of falling trees; an additional three people in Capiz were feared to have drowned due to floods. Two thousand people became stranded after the Philippine Coast Guard cancelled the operation of 43 ferry services. Similarly, 8,000 people became stranded at seaports after the coast guard barred vessels from sailing. Extensive damage occurred in Occidental Mindoro, where 422 homes were destroyed and an additional 1,421 damaged. Rough seas caused the outriggers on a ferry between Batangas and Puerto Galera, Oriental Mindoro to break apart, causing the ship to begin disintegrating offshore. However, the 104 passengers and crew on board were able to escape and were later rescued. Further north in southern Luzon, roads and bridges were rendered impassable after sustaining damage.

A state of emergency was declared for Aklan, where property damage equated to ₱51 million (US$1 million). (Note: The total was originally reported in Philippine pesos, and was converted to United States dollars via the Oanda Corporation website.) The Central Visayas region of the Philippines suffered the worst impacts, with a damage cost of ₱345.2 million (US$7 million), primarily to agriculture. Following the storm's passage, chapters of the Philippine Red Cross assisted in relief efforts in impacted areas. The Philippine Department of Social Welfare and Development allocated ₱27.7 million (US$600,000) to relief efforts. Food and sheltering were provided to 2,615 people in three provinces by the Adventist Development and Relief Agency. Many localized relief agencies donated sacks of rice to impacted residents. The United Nations appealed for US$46 million for use in recovery efforts following Utor in addition to the three Philippine typhoons which preceded it. Overall, the impacts of Utor killed 30 people and injured 44 in the Philippines. Another eight people were never accounted for. The damage toll wrought by Utor amounted to US$15.8 million. Furthermore, 36,542 houses were damaged by Utor, of which 9,439 were destroyed. Capiz and Aklan were the areas that sustained the most residential damage. People who were evacuated out of hazardous regions in advance of Utor were able to return home beginning on December 18, nine days after initial landfall.

=== Elsewhere in Southeastern Asia ===
Thailand's Royal Irrigation Department released water from local dams in order to mitigate a potential flood event caused by Utor. Flooded areas of the western half of the country drained floodwaters into the Chao Phraya River. Off of Malaysia, a rough sea warning for coastal stretches of Sabah and northern Sarawak due to the threat of high wind-swept waves caused by Utor. In Vietnam, delegations were sent to coastal areas to guide residents in preparing for Utor and secure fishing boats, while troops were sent to reinforce buildings and fortify sea defenses. Preparations for "mass evacuations" also went into effect, particularly along Vietnam's central coastline. Border guards called back 3,785 fishing vessels with over 21,000 fishermen to shore. Aircraft, automobiles, canoes, and ships were dispatched into threatened areas to disseminate information regarding the typhoon. Similar precautionary measures took place in Hainan, where more than 20,000 fishing boats were called back to shore. Forty-nine people were evacuated out of the Paracel Islands due to the threat of the typhoon.

As Utor was traversing the South China Sea, a fishing boat became stranded near Langhua Reef in the Paracel Islands; the occupants were rescued by a rescue ship operated by the Hainan Maritime Bureau, though five were flown to hospitals for medical treatment. A total of 140 sheds on the islands of Yongxing, Yayong, Zhaoshu, and Bei Dao were flattened by the passing typhoon, while a ship at harbor sank and five others ran aground. On the Qilian Yu island sub-group, 98 fishermen on the islands were rescued by the Nanhai Rescue Bureau following days without clean water and food supplies. Utor had destroyed all of the islands' bunkhouses, resulting in requests for rescue.

Moisture associated with Utor was partially blamed for heavy rains which produced extensive flooding in Peninsular Malaysia; these floods were the first in a long string of flood events that would plague the region until February 2007. The tropical moisture acted in tandem with wind shear and a monsoonal flow to produce continuous precipitation over the Malaysian states of Pahang, Johor, and Malacca. Rainfall peaked at 567.8 mm (22.35 in) in Bandar Muadzam Shah over a four-day period, with similar rainfall totals occurring elsewhere. These floods were considered the worst in the history of southern Malaysia. The worst-affected areas were Segamat and Kota Tinggi, where both towns were inaccessible by land after all main roads leading to those towns were flooded. Eight fatalities resulted from the historical flooding.

== See also ==
- Other tropical cyclones named Utor
- Other tropical cyclones named Seniang
- Typhoons in the Philippines
- Other typhoons that impacted the Philippines in 2006:
  - Typhoon Chanchu
  - Typhoon Xangsane
  - Typhoon Cimaron
  - Typhoon Chebi
  - Typhoon Durian
- Typhoon Axel (1994) – Late-year typhoon which passed through the central Philippines
- Typhoon Faith (1998) – Displaced several thousand people after ravaging the central Philippines
- Typhoon Nepartak (2003) – Caused extensive power outages and agricultural damage in the Philippines before peaking in the South China Sea
- Typhoon Haiyan (2013) – A storm with a nearly similar track that caused extreme damage in the same areas. particularly in the Visayas
- Typhoon Phanfone (2019) - A storm that also have a nearly similar track as Utor.
- Typhoon Rai (2021) - Also had a similar path with a second peak in the South China Sea, also devastated the same areas as Utor with substantial damage
