= List of storms named Paeng =

The name Paeng has been used for four tropical cyclones in the Philippine Area of Responsibility by PAGASA in the Western Pacific Ocean. It replaced the name Paloma following the 2002 Pacific typhoon season for unknown reasons (although it was possibly removed due to its connection to the late entertainer Pepsi Paloma).

- Typhoon Cimaron (2006) (T0619, 22W, Paeng) – made landfall over the Philippines after its peak strength as a category 5 typhoon.
- Typhoon Nuri (2014) (T1420, 20W, Paeng) – an intense category 5 equivalent typhoon; did not make landfall.
- Typhoon Trami (2018) (T1824, 28W, Paeng) – another Category 5 super typhoon that later made landfall in Japan as a weaker system.
- Severe Tropical Storm Nalgae (2022) (T2222, 26W, Paeng) – a severe tropical storm that devastated the Philippines, claiming more than 120 lives.

The name Paeng was retired following the 2022 Pacific typhoon season and was replaced with Pilandok, which refers to the Philippine mouse-deer (Tragulus nigricans) in Tagalog.
