= Typhoon Cimaron (2006) =

Pacific typhoon in 2006

Typhoon Cimaron (Paeng)
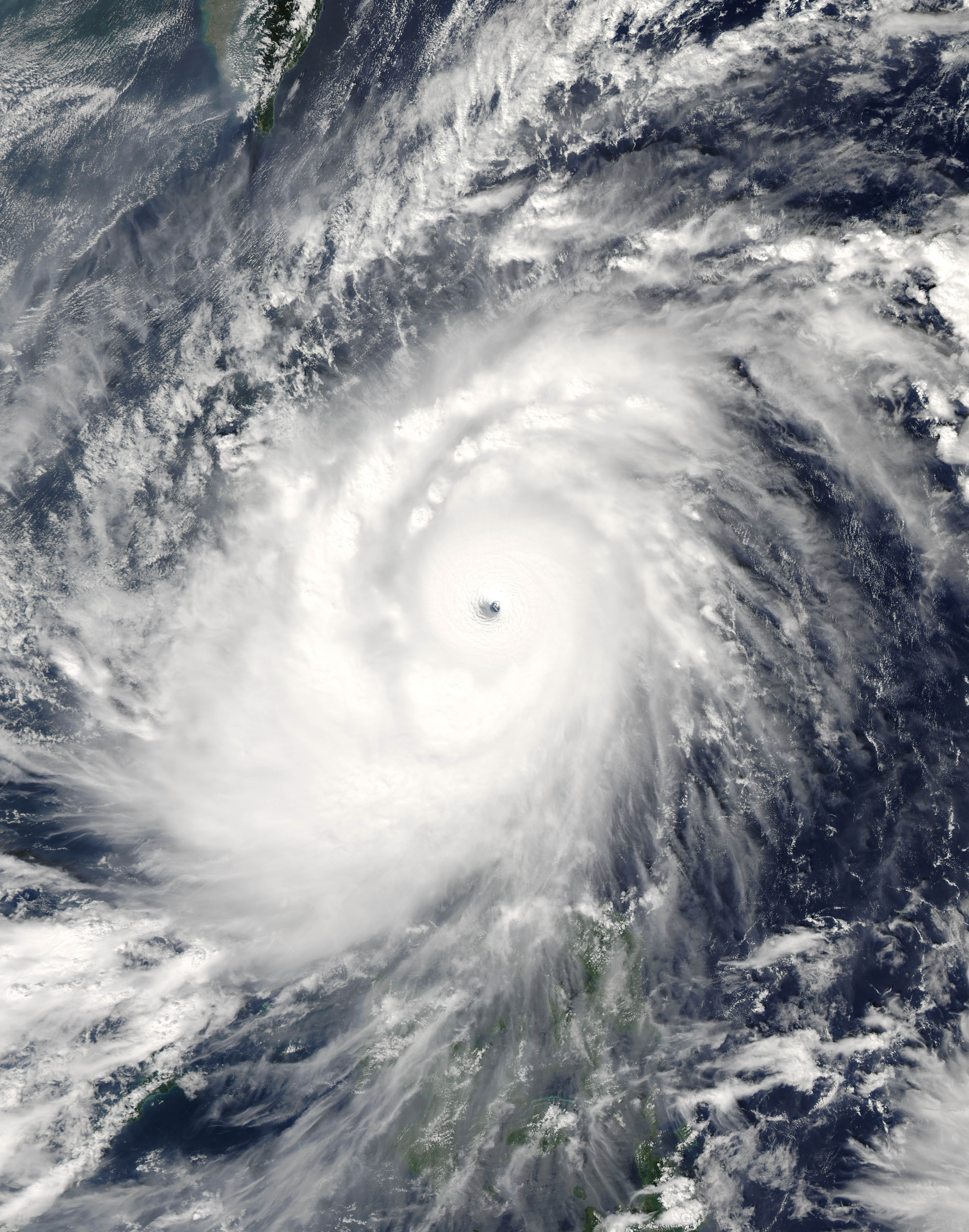
- Cimaron near peak intensity off the Luzon coast, on October 29

Meteorological history
- Formed: October 25, 2006
- Dissipated: November 7, 2006

Very strong typhoon
- 10-minute sustained (JMA)
- Highest winds: 185 km/h (115 mph)
- Lowest pressure: 920 hPa (mbar); 27.17 inHg

Category 5-equivalent super typhoon
- 1-minute sustained (SSHWS/JTWC)
- Highest winds: 260 km/h (160 mph)
- Lowest pressure: 898 hPa (mbar); 26.52 inHg

Overall effects
- Fatalities: 34 total
- Damage: $31 million (2006 USD)
- Areas affected: Philippines, Hong Kong, British Columbia (indirectly)
- IBTrACS
- Part of the 2006 Pacific typhoon season

Typhoon Cimaron, (Note: The name Cimaron (Tagalog: cimaron, [simɐɾo̞n]) was contributed by the Philippines and means "to be wild, ferocious" in Tagalog.) known in the Philippines as Super Typhoon Paeng, was the most intense tropical cyclone to strike the Philippine island of Luzon since Typhoon Zeb in 1998. Originating from a tropical depression on October 25, Cimaron developed within an environment strongly favoring tropical cyclogenesis east of the Philippines. On October 28, the system underwent rapid intensification, culminating in attaining its peak strength with winds of 185 km/h (115 mph). Estimates from the Joint Typhoon Warning Center ranked the system as a Category 5-equivalent super typhoon with one-minute sustained winds of 260 km/h (160 mph), though this is argued to have underrepresented the typhoon's strength. The system moved ashore near Casiguran, Aurora in northern Luzon at peak strength. Crossing the island, Cimaron emerged over the South China Sea where conditions allowed for temporary reorganization. After becoming nearly stationary on November 1, the typhoon executed a tight anti-cyclonic loop and rapidly weakened. The storm degenerated into a tropical depression on November 4, before dissipating three days later off the coast of Vietnam.

Prior to impacting the Philippines, Public Storm Warning Signals #3 and #4, the two highest levels, were raised for several provinces in Luzon. Thousands of residents were urged to evacuate while local authorities prepared services for quick recovery efforts. With Cimaron initially expected to strike Vietnam, officials planned to evacuate 218,000 people; however, Cimaron's slow motion and demise over open waters resulted in these plans being suspended. Officials in Thailand and southern China also advised residents of possible effects from the storm.

In contrast to the typhoon's extreme intensity, damage was somewhat limited in the Philippines due to the lower population density of the affected areas. Widespread flooding and landslides caused substantial disruptions to travel and isolated some communities. Thirty-four people were killed in various incidents, mostly from flooding. Nearly 365,000 people were affected by the storm and losses amounted to 1.21 billion PHP (US$31 million). (Note: All damage totals are in 2006 values of their respective currencies.) Winds along the periphery of Cimaron fanned a large wildfire near Hong Kong, and moisture from it fueled record-breaking rains in British Columbia, Canada. Relief efforts in the Philippines began soon after the storm's passage; however, two other storms struck the country in November, with one resulting in far greater damage. Following a request for international assistance in early December, more than US$10 million was provided in relief aid to the Philippines.

== Meteorological history ==
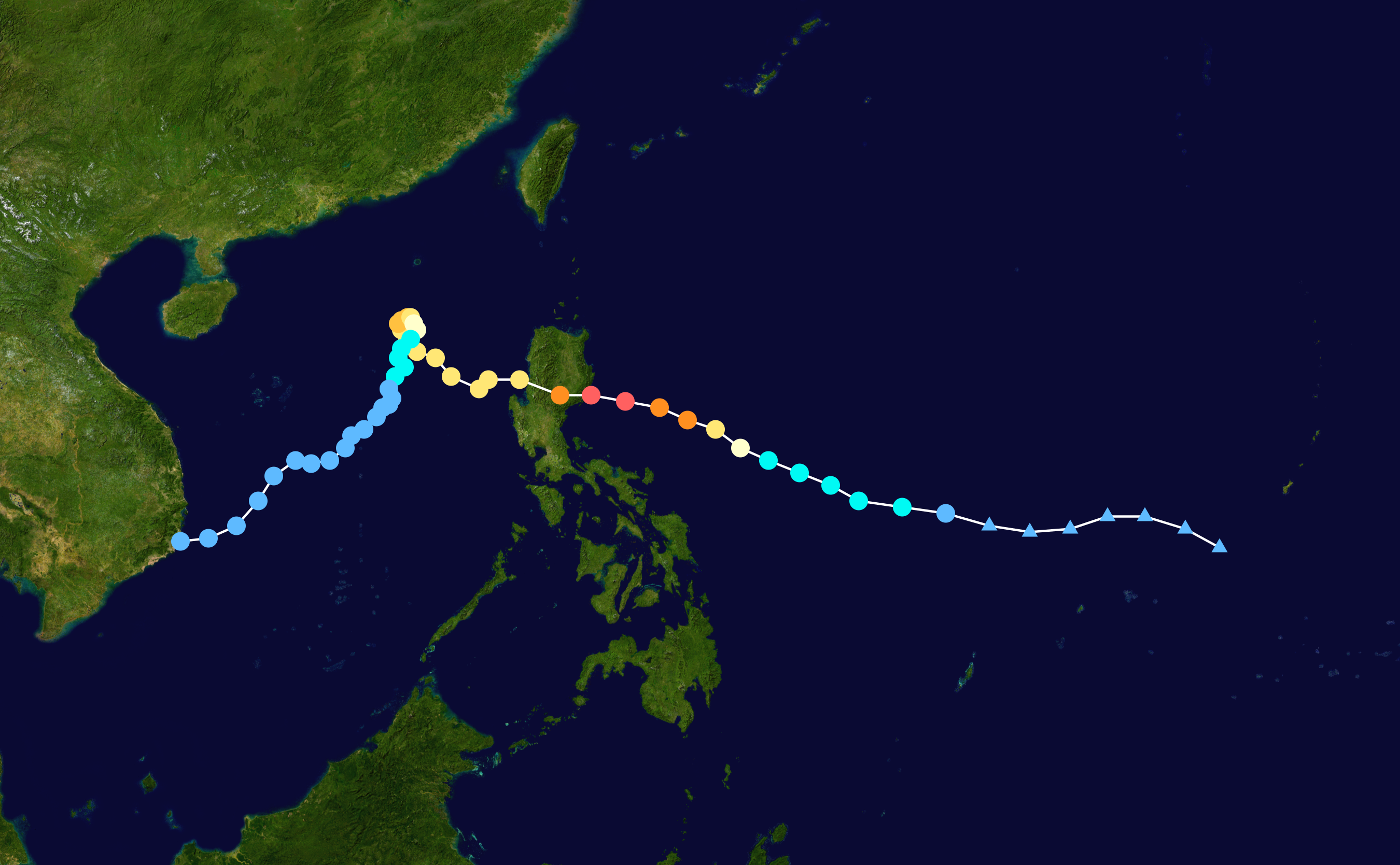
Map plotting the storm's track and intensity, according to the Saffir–Simpson scale Map key Saffir–Simpson scale Tropical depression (≤38 mph, ≤62 km/h) Tropical storm (39–73 mph, 63–118 km/h) Category 1 (74–95 mph, 119–153 km/h) Category 2 (96–110 mph, 154–177 km/h) Category 3 (111–129 mph, 178–208 km/h) Category 4 (130–156 mph, 209–251 km/h) Category 5 (≥157 mph, ≥252 km/h) Unknown Storm type Tropical cyclone Subtropical cyclone Extratropical cyclone, remnant low, tropical disturbance, or monsoon depression

On October 24, 2006, an area of disturbed weather, characterized by flaring convection around a low-level circulation, developed approximately 595 km (370 mi) east of Guam. Situated within a region favoring tropical cyclogenesis, the system consolidated as it tracked generally westward. Late on October 25, the Japan Meteorological Agency (JMA) classified the low as a tropical depression. (Note: The Japan Meteorological Agency is the official Regional Specialized Meteorological Center for the western Pacific Ocean.) With poleward outflow improving, the Joint Typhoon Warning Center (JTWC) issued a Tropical Cyclone Formation Alert the following day before initiating advisories on Tropical Depression 22W. (Note: The Joint Typhoon Warning Center is a joint United States Navy – United States Air Force task force that issues tropical cyclone warnings for the western Pacific Ocean and other regions.) Several hours later, the Philippine Atmospheric, Geophysical and Astronomical Services Administration assigned the storm the local name Paeng as was within their area of responsibility. Situated south of a strong subtropical ridge, the system maintained a general west-northwest track. On October 27, the depression strengthened into a tropical storm and was assigned the name Cimaron by the JMA. The small storm subsequently underwent a period of rapid intensification as dual outflow channels developed; the storm reached typhoon status early on October 28. At the end of this phase on October 29, Cimaron attained its peak intensity with winds of 185 km/h (115 mph) and a barometric pressure of 920 mbar (hPa; 27.17 inHg).

The JTWC estimated Cimaron to have been a stronger system, attaining its peak intensity as a Category 5-equivalent super typhoon with one-minute winds of 260 km/h (160 mph). (Note: A super typhoon is defined as a tropical cyclone with one-minute sustained winds of at least 240 km/h (150 mph).) However, satellite estimates from forecasters within the agency itself, the National Oceanic and Atmospheric Administration's Satellite Analysis Branch (SAB), the Air Force Weather Agency (AFWA), and Dr. Karl Hoarau of Cergy-Pontoise University stated Cimaron to have been an even stronger system. Using the Dvorak technique – a method of determining a tropical cyclone's intensity based on satellite appearance – AFWA and SAB yielded a peak value of T7.5, 285 km/h (177 mph), while advanced operational values from the JTWC peaked at T7.8, 305 km/h (190 mph). Additionally, a forecaster at SAB noted that the lower estimates were likely due to restrictions on the Dvorak technique stemming from Cimaron's rapid intensification. The forecaster also noted that a second type of estimate gave a maximum value of T8.0, 315 km/h (196 mph), the highest rating on the scale.

While at its peak strength, Cimaron displayed two small concentric eyewalls, separated by a few kilometres. The storm later made landfall near Casiguran, Aurora in northern Luzon shortly after 1200 UTC on October 29; it became one of the strongest storms to ever hit the region. Interaction with the island's mountainous terrain caused substantial weakening, though Cimaron maintained typhoon status during its 12‑hour crossing. After emerging over the South China Sea on October 30, the system initially maintained its west-northwest course. However, the following day, a weakness developed within the ridge previously steering the typhoon, and Cimaron briefly turned north before essentially stalling. During this time, the system reorganized somewhat and reached a secondary peak intensity with winds of 165 km/h (103 mph) on November 2. While executing a tight clockwise loop, increased wind shear and entrainment of dry air soon caused Cimaron to dramatically weaken. With a new ridge becoming established over China, the weakening system acquired a general southwestward track. Cimaron weakened to a tropical depression on November 4 and ultimately dissipated three days later, just off the coast of southeastern Vietnam.

== Preparations ==
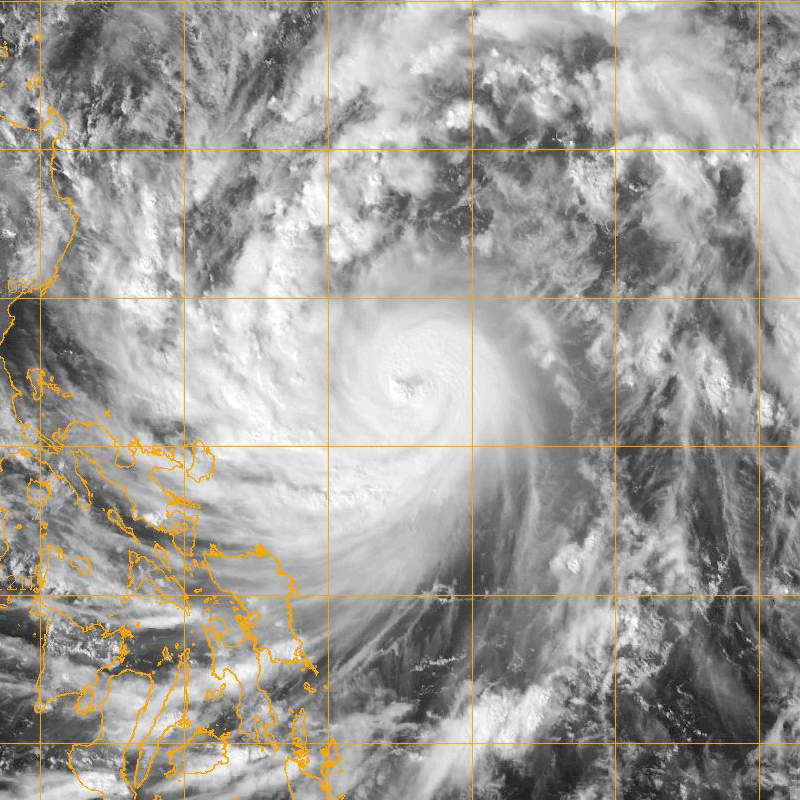
Typhoon Cimaron rapidly intensifying off the Luzon coast on October 28

By October 28, Isabela, southern Cagayan, Quirino, and northern Aurora provinces were placed under Public Storm Warning Signal (PSWS) #3, the second-highest level. More than 20 provinces overall were placed under varying PSWS levels. Residents living along the coast were urged to evacuate. Early on October 29, several provinces along Luzon's east coast were placed under PSWS #4, the highest level of alert. During a national radio broadcast President Gloria Macapagal Arroyo urged residents to heed warnings and not to venture out during the storm. Throughout Luzon, schools and government offices were closed on October 29 while residents in mountainous areas were urged to evacuate due to threat of mudslides. The National Transmission Corporation deployed power restoration crews across the region to allow for quick post-storm response. Hospitals in Cimaron's projected path requested employees to be present in anticipation of an influx of patients. Quick response teams from the Department of Social Welfare and Development were placed on standby for possible deployment. Within evacuation areas, the Philippine National Police was dispatched to prevent people from returning to these areas. Bus companies suspended all services north of Tarlac City and San Jose.

As Cimaron emerged over the South China Sea, officials in Vietnam began preparing for possible effects from the storm. Authorities began evacuating residents in flood-prone areas along the coast from Quảng Bình Khánh Hòa, including 12,500 in Thừa Thiên-Huế Province. Fishermen were urged to seek shelter at nearby ports until the storm subsided. The Vietnamese Government also requested the deployment of the nation's Army, Coast Guard, and Navy to assist in evacuation efforts. Residents still recovering from Typhoon Xangsane in early October were forced to secure their homes and evacuate once again. An estimated 218,000 people were planned to be relocated across Vietnam: 68,000 in Quảng Nam, 60,000 in Quảng Trị, 50,000 in Thừa Thiên-Huế, and 40,000 in Quảng Bình. Appeals were made to roughly 3,500 vessels, with a collective crew count of 32,285, to return to port. The Navy deployed 42 ships for possible search and rescue missions. Following Cimaron's change in course and cessation of movement, the Vietnamese Government suspended all evacuation plans on November 2; however, fishermen were urged to remain at port in fears of repeating the incidents during Typhoon Chanchu in May of that year where over 200 fishermen died.

Officials in Thailand also monitored the storm as a potential flood threat. Many reservoirs in the nation were above 80 percent capacity and further heavy rains would lead to a major flood event; the main concerns were for the Bhumibol and Sirikit dams in Tak and Uttaradit provinces, respectively. Authorities in Hainan province, China, warned of possible effects from the storm as well beginning on October 31. Heavy squalls, with winds of 50 to 100 km/h (31 to 62 mph) were forecast for eastern areas of the island and areas offshore. By November 1, approximately 20,000 fishing vessels returned to port as conditions over the South China Sea deteriorated; shipping over the Qiongzhou Strait remained unaffected.

== Impact ==
=== Philippines ===
Infrared satellite loop of Typhoon Cimaron making landfall in Luzon on October 29

Typhoon Cimaron struck the Philippines with winds estimated at 195 km/h (121 mph) and gusts in excess of 230 km/h (140 mph). Along coastal Aurora Province, a mother and daughter were killed when strong winds destroyed their home. Numerous trees and power lines were felled by the winds as well, causing widespread blackouts in Luzon. The majority of Aurora and Isabela provinces were left without power and telecommunications for more than two weeks. Approximately 90 percent of the homes in Dinapigue were damaged. Heavy rains across the region swelled many rivers, flooding low-lying areas along their banks. Several bridges became impassable and officials had to release water from two major dams to prevent them from overflowing. The most significant flooding occurred along the Allied-Sinocalan and Tagamusing rivers in Pangasinan. Low-lying areas along the Cagayan, Chico, Magat, Pinacanauan, Tuguegarao Pared rivers throughout Cagayan province were also affected by flooding. Numerous roads were blocked off by landslides or washed away by flooding, severely limiting travel. A landslide temporarily isolated four barangays in Nueva Vizcaya. A Provincial Disaster Coordinating Council search and rescue team was later deployed to Kasibu where at least four people were killed by flooding. Fatal landslides took place in Benguet and Kalinga provinces. A traffic accident blamed on the storm in La Union resulted in one death and seven injuries.

Throughout the Philippines, damage amounted to roughly 1.21 billion PHP (US$31 million), of which 664 million PHP (US$17 million) was attributed to agriculture. Approximately eight percent of the corn and rice harvest was destroyed. A total of 2,605 homes were destroyed while another 18,181 were damaged. Across seven provinces, 364,733 people were affected by the typhoon, 65,585 of whom were significantly impacted. A total of 34 people died as a result of Cimaron. Additionally, 65 people sustained injuries.

=== Elsewhere ===
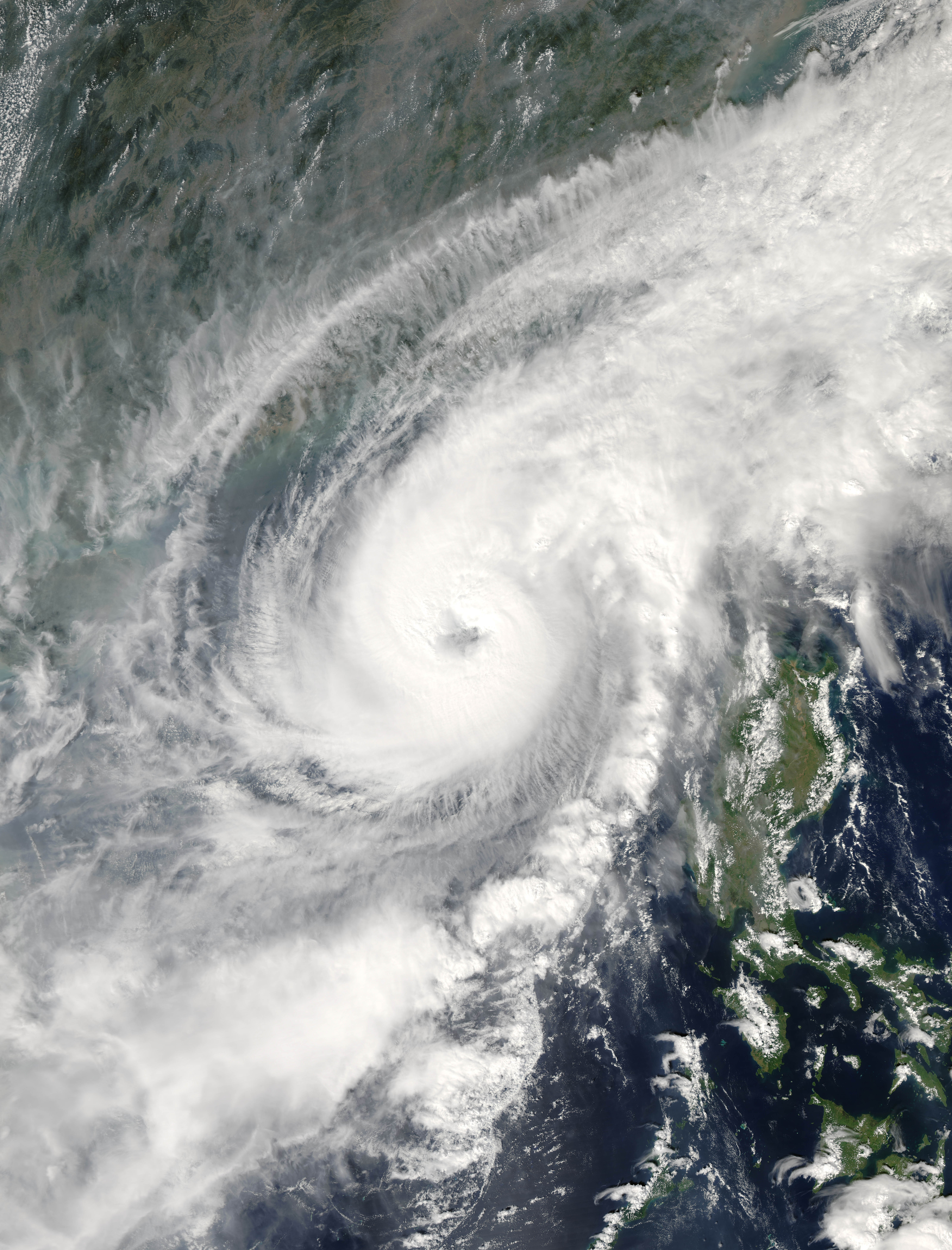
Typhoon Cimaron over the South China Sea on October 31

Though the storm remained over open waters after moving over the South China Sea, strong winds stemming from it fanned a large wildfire in Tai Lam Country Park, Hong Kong. At least 136 fires ignited on October 30 during the Chung Yeung Festival. The Tai Lam fire grew to be the largest in over a decade, ultimately charring 450 hectares (1,100 acres) and 66,000 trees. The storm's winds coupled with seasonally low humidity made conditions difficult for firefighters trying to suppress the fire. Over the South China Sea, the 128 m (420 ft) long Chinese cargo ship, Tongda 998, became stranded amid 5 m (16 ft) swells and 75-to-88 km/h (47-to-55 mph) winds after its engine failed. All 18 crewmen were unharmed after the vessel was towed to port in Zhuhai by the rescue ship Dejin.

Moisture from the typhoon also fed an extratropical cyclone, in an atmospheric river known as the Pineapple Express, that brought heavy rains to southern British Columbia, Canada, prompting flood watches for the region Southern areas of the province were deluged by the storm, with some areas receiving 250 to 300 mm (9.8 to 11.8 in) of rain. The daily rainfall record for November 6 of 20.6 mm (0.81 in) at Victoria International Airport was shattered with 50.4 mm (1.98 in) falling. Widespread flooding occurred as rivers over-topped their banks; hundreds of homes were inundated, prompting numerous evacuations. The Vedder River reached a 25-year high and forced the evacuation 200 residences.

== Aftermath ==
Damage assessments in the Philippines began on October 31, with aerial surveys being utilized for isolated areas. With numerous roads blocked off or washed away, clearing operations were a priority. The Philippine Red Cross assisted in the immediate aftermath of Typhoon Cimaron, evacuating people in La Union and providing relief goods to more than 16,000 people in Aurora. The majority of relief work was handled by local governments, though some assistance from the National Disaster Coordinating Council was received. By November 1, the estimated cost of humanitarian assistance reached 3.2 million PHP (US$81,000). Teams from the Red Cross were already deployed in the Philippines due to Typhoon Xangsane in September and were able to quickly respond in Cimaron's aftermath. Relief efforts for Cimaron were cut short as just two weeks later, Typhoon Chebi struck nearly the same areas. A weaker, though still powerful typhoon, damage from Chebi was relatively limited.

In late November, Typhoon Durian brought even greater devastation to the Philippines and prompted greater need for international assistance. On December 11, President Arroyo declared a national state of calamity and released 1 billion PHP (US$25.6 million) in relief and rehabilitation funds. Throughout 2006 as a whole, the Philippines was devastated by multiple natural disasters that collectively killed well over 1,000 people and left more than US$1.6 billion in damage. Consequently, the United Nations Office for the Coordination of Humanitarian Affairs appealed for emergency assistance to the nation, in the form of US$46 million in funds for the most severely affected areas. The European Commission Humanitarian Aid department also provided €2 million (US$1.9 million) in emergency funds in relation to the four major typhoons that struck the country, with a focus on areas affected by Typhoon Durian. The Red Cross ultimately provided US$9.67 million in assistance to the nation in relation to the four typhoons as well as Typhoon Fengshen in June 2008 which struck while relief efforts from the 2006 storms were still ongoing.

== See also ==
- Other tropical cyclones named Cimaron
- Other tropical cyclones named Paeng
- Typhoons in the Philippines
- Other typhoons that impacted the Philippines in 2006:
  - Typhoon Chanchu
  - Typhoon Xangsane
  - Typhoon Chebi
  - Typhoon Durian
  - Typhoon Utor
- Typhoon Krosa (2013) - Another typhoon that made landfall in Luzon then stalled over the South China Sea
- Tropical Storm Aere (2016) - Also had slow movement in the South China Sea before impacting Vietnam
