= Typhoon Durian =

Pacific typhoon in 2006

Typhoon Durian (Reming)
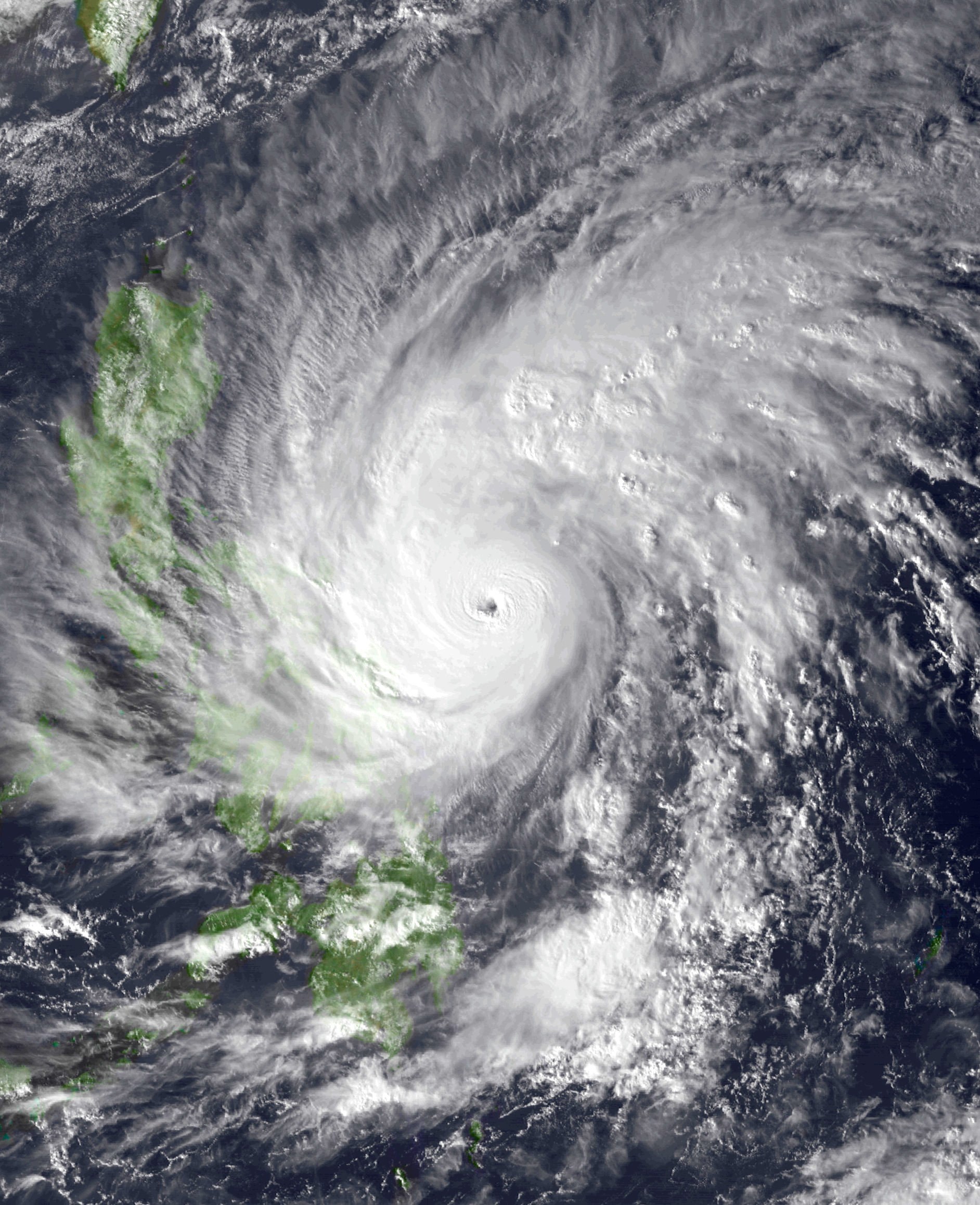
- Typhoon Durian approaching the Philippines near peak intensity on November 29

Meteorological history
- Formed: November 25, 2006
- Remnant low: December 6, 2006
- Dissipated: December 6, 2006 (December 9 per JTWC)

Violent typhoon
- 10-minute sustained (JMA)
- Highest winds: 195 km/h (120 mph)
- Lowest pressure: 915 hPa (mbar); 27.02 inHg

Category 4-equivalent super typhoon
- 1-minute sustained (SSHWS/JTWC)
- Highest winds: 250 km/h (155 mph)
- Lowest pressure: 904 hPa (mbar); 26.70 inHg

Overall effects
- Fatalities: >1,500
- Damage: >$580 million (2006 USD)
- Areas affected: Yap State, Philippines, Vietnam, Thailand, Malaysia, Andaman Islands, India
- IBTrACS
- Part of the 2006 Pacific typhoon season

Typhoon Durian, (Note: The name Durian (Thai: ทุเรียน, [tʰu˦˥(ʔ) ria̯n˧]) was contributed by Thailand and means durian (Durio zibethinus) in Thai.) known in the Philippines as Typhoon Reming, was a deadly and devastating tropical cyclone that struck the Philippines and Vietnam in late 2006. The 21st named storm of the annual typhoon season, Durian formed in late November 2006 over the western Pacific Ocean near the Federated States of Micronesia. It intensified into a powerful typhoon while moving westward toward the Philippines.

Late on November 29, the Japan Meteorological Agency (JMA) (Note: The Japan Meteorological Agency is the official Regional Specialized Meteorological Center for the western Pacific Ocean.) assessed that Durian reached peak winds of 195 km/h (121 mph) sustained over 10 minutes. After slight weakening, Durian moved through central Philippines on November 30, emerging into the South China Sea the next day. A few days later, Durian hit southern Vietnam, and after weakening over land, emerged into the Gulf of Thailand. On December 6, the former typhoon moved across Thailand as a tropical depression, emerging into the Bay of Bengal, where it failed to redevelop.

Typhoon Durian caused massive loss of life when mudflows from the Mayon Volcano buried many villages. Durian first made landfall in the Philippines, packing strong winds and heavy rains that caused mudflows near Mayon Volcano. In Vietnam, Durian caused further damage of more than US$450 million. In all, Durian killed almost 2,000 people, and left hundreds more missing. Damages in the Philippines from the typhoon amounted to 5.086 billion PHP (US$130 million).

== Meteorological history ==
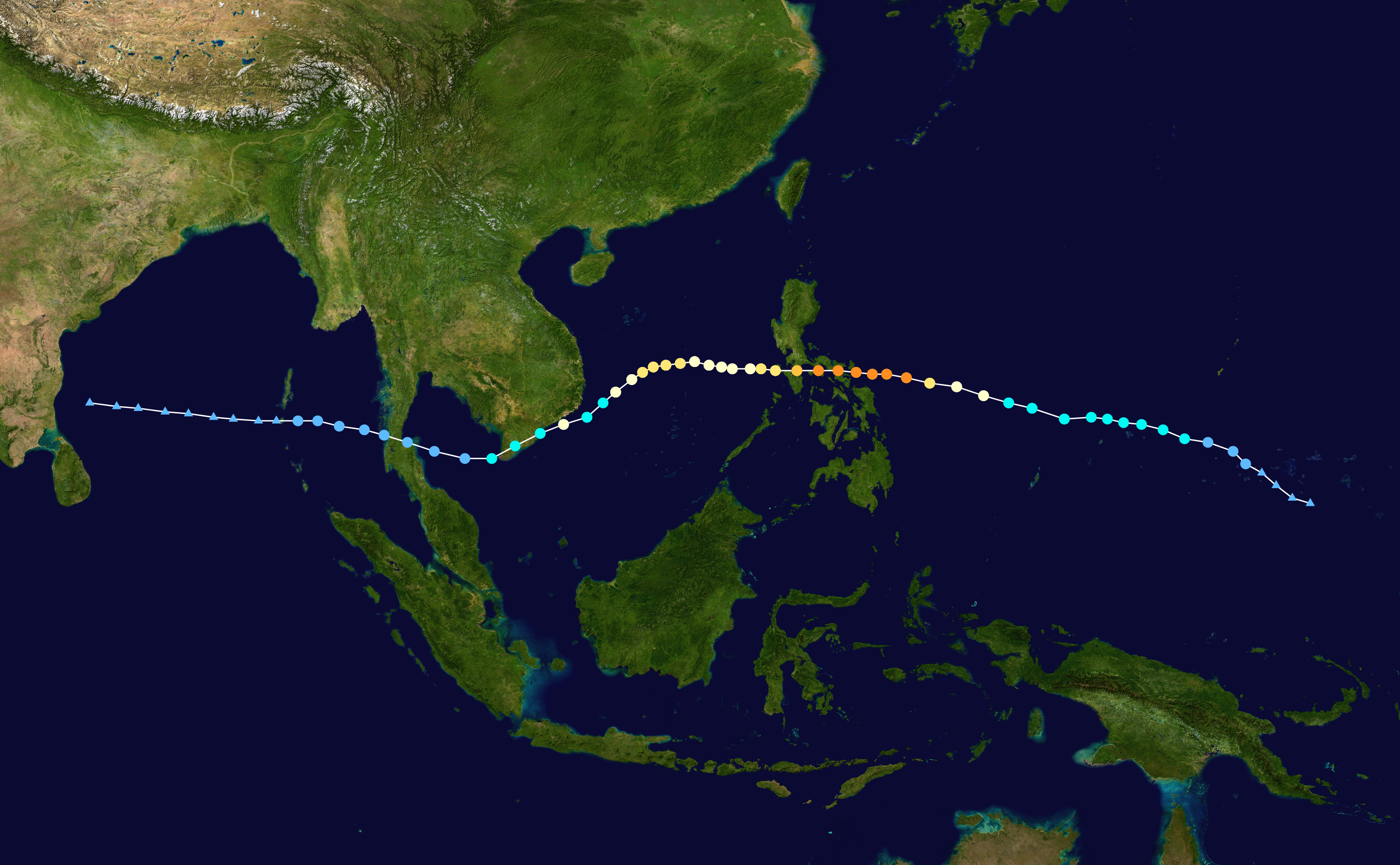
Map plotting the storm's track and intensity, according to the Saffir–Simpson scale Map key Saffir–Simpson scale Tropical depression (≤38 mph, ≤62 km/h) Tropical storm (39–73 mph, 63–118 km/h) Category 1 (74–95 mph, 119–153 km/h) Category 2 (96–110 mph, 154–177 km/h) Category 3 (111–129 mph, 178–208 km/h) Category 4 (130–156 mph, 209–251 km/h) Category 5 (≥157 mph, ≥252 km/h) Unknown Storm type Tropical cyclone Subtropical cyclone Extratropical cyclone, remnant low, tropical disturbance, or monsoon depression

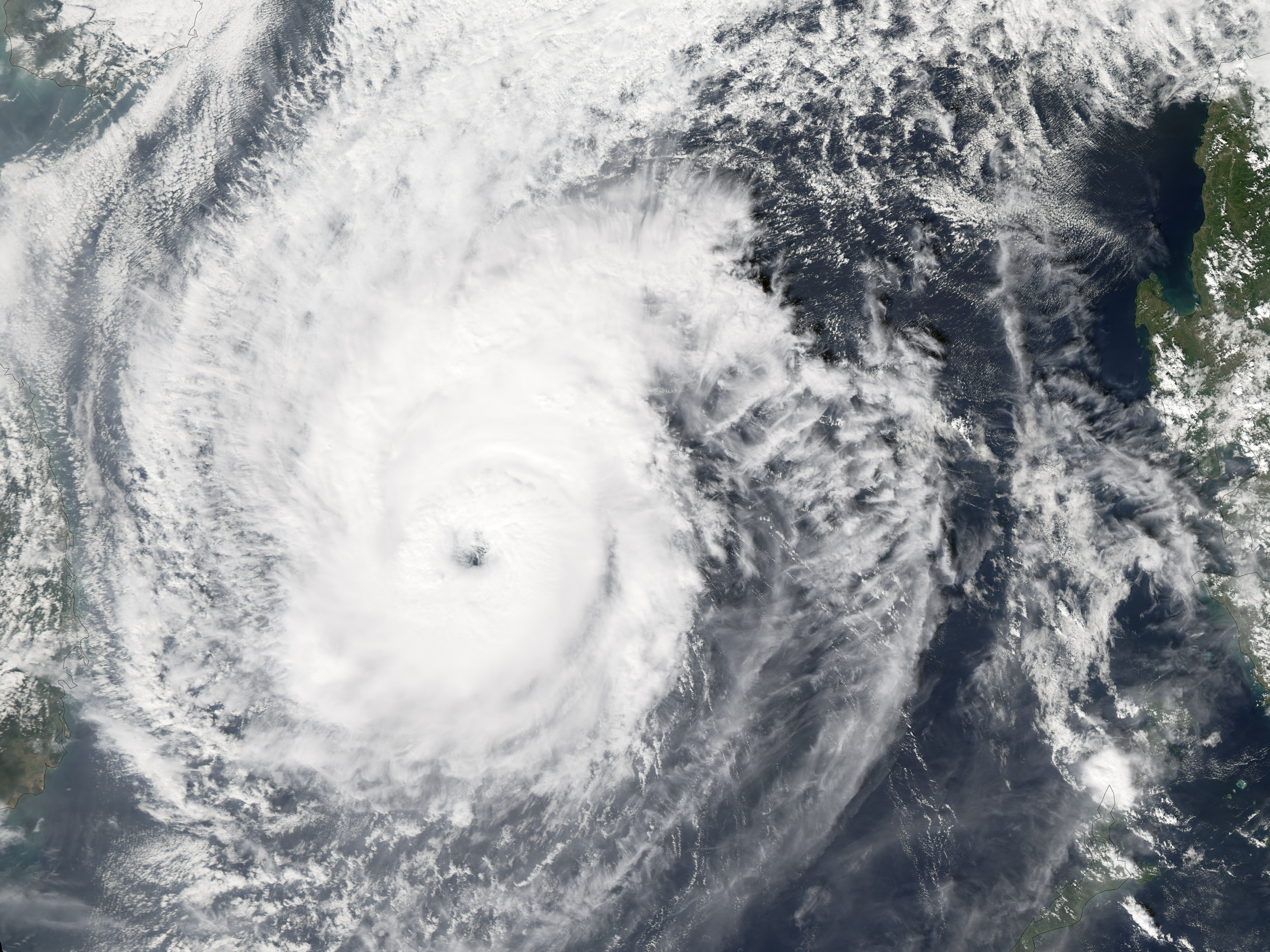
Typhoon Durian reached the second peak on December 3rd.

The origins of Typhoon Durian can be traced to a tropical disturbance that developed near Chuuk State in the Federated States of Micronesia on November 23. Initially, the system featured a broad low- to mid-level circulation and good outflow. Situated within an area of moderate wind shear, development was initially inhibited; however, following a decrease in shear on November 25, organization improved. On November 25, a tropical wave – an elongated area of low air pressure moving from east to west – interacted with the system and triggered tropical cyclogenesis. Post-storm modeling determined that this wave was an essential factor in the storm's formation and had it not formed, Durian would not have become a tropical cyclone. With convection wrapping into the storm's circulation, the JTWC classified it as a tropical depression around 1200 UTC. The Japan Meteorological Agency (JMA) followed suit three hours later. Situated south of a mid-level ridge, the system tracked generally west-northwest toward the Philippines. The depression gradually organized and gained strength, reaching tropical storm status late on November 26. At that time, the JMA assigned it the name Durian.

On November 27, the JTWC noted that Durian could undergo explosive intensification as it moved over the Philippine Sea two days later, similar to what took place with Typhoons Cimaron and Chebi. However, there was less confidence in this scenario due to the presence of dry air west of the cyclone. On November 28, the Philippine Atmospheric, Geophysical and Astronomical Services Administration assigned the storm the local name Reming as it entered their area of responsibility. At 1200 UTC that day, the JTWC upgraded Durian to a typhoon, estimating one-minute sustained winds at 120 km/h (75 mph). It was not until 0300 UTC on November 29 that the JMA also upgraded the storm. During the course of November 29, a westward-moving convectively-coupled Kelvin wave interacted with Durian and provided additional convergence around the typhoon. This precipitated a period of rapid intensification as the cyclone's vorticity abruptly deepened and reached to more than 10 km (6.2 mi) in altitude. At 0530 UTC, intensity estimates using the Dvorak technique – a method of determining a tropical cyclone's intensity based on satellite appearance – yielded a raw value of 7.0, indicating one-minute sustained winds of 260 km/h (160 mph). By this time, a clear 26 km (16 mi) wide eye had formed within a ring of deep convection.

Satellite imagery of Typhoon Durian throughout its formation from November 26 until its dissipation on December 6

Durian attained its peak intensity late on November 29 just off the coast of the Philippines with winds of 195 km/h (121 mph) and a barometric pressure of 915 millibars (915 hPa; 27.0 inHg). The JTWC estimated Durian to have been somewhat stronger with one-minute winds of 250 km/h (160 mph), making it a Category 4-equivalent super typhoon on the Saffir–Simpson scale. By the end of the rapid intensification phase, Durian turned nearly due west as a subtropical ridge built to its north. Although expected to gradually turn northwest along the southwestern periphery of the ridge, topographical effects from the Philippines were expected to limited poleward progression. Weakening somewhat, Durian brushed the southern coast of the Catanduanes early on November 30. At 0200 UTC, a weather station in Virac recorded sustained winds of 120 km/h (75 mph) and 941.4 mbar (941.4 hPa; 27.80 inHg) pressure. Gusts at the station peaked at 320 km/h (200 mph) before the anemometer broke. This was the highest value ever recorded in the Philippines, greatly exceeding previous record of 275 km/h (171 mph) during Typhoon Joan of 1970. Shortly thereafter, Durian made landfall in northern Albay Province; winds at this time were estimated at 165 km/h (103 mph).

Interaction with land induced steady weakening of the typhoon as it moved westward over the Philippines. The storm made two additional landfalls in Quezon and Marinduque after moving over Ragay Gulf and Sibuyan Sea, respectively. Passing over the Isla Verde Passage, Durian emerged into the South China Sea early on December 1 as a minimal typhoon. During the storm's crossing of the Philippines, the area of deep convection surrounding the center expanded from 1.0 to 2.2 degrees to 2.2–3.0 degrees; however, unlike many other typhoons, the eye collapsed and failed to fully redevelop once clear of the islands. Gradual re-intensification occurred over the subsequent days, with the storm attaining a secondary peak strength of 150 km/h (93 mph) early on December 3. Influenced by monsoonal flow, Durian soon turned southwestwards and began paralleling the Vietnamese coastline. Increasing wind shear and inflow of cooler air quickly weakened the system, with winds dropping below typhoon-force early on December 4. As Durian neared the coast of extreme southeastern Vietnam, a slight discrepancy in classification occurred between the JMA and the JTWC. While the former noted a steady weakening trend, the JTWC briefly re-classified Durian as a typhoon late on December 4.

Ultimately, Durian made its fourth overall landfall early on December 5 over the Mekong Delta south of Ho Chi Minh City with winds of 85 km/h (53 mph). Within hours of moving onshore, a combination of land interaction and poor upper-level outflow caused all deep convection to dissipate. The system degraded to a tropical depression before emerging over the Gulf of Thailand. The depression later made landfall over Surat Thani Province, Thailand early on December 6 before crossing into the Bay of Bengal. Once over water, the circulation became increasingly well-defined and convective banding reformed along the south side of the low. Environmental conditions were marginally favorable for development; however, Durian failed to reorganize further and degenerated into a remnant low late on December 7 as it moved just south of the Andaman Islands. The remnants continued generally westward across the Bay and later dissipated on December 9 off the coast of Andhra Pradesh, India.

== Preparations ==
=== Philippines ===
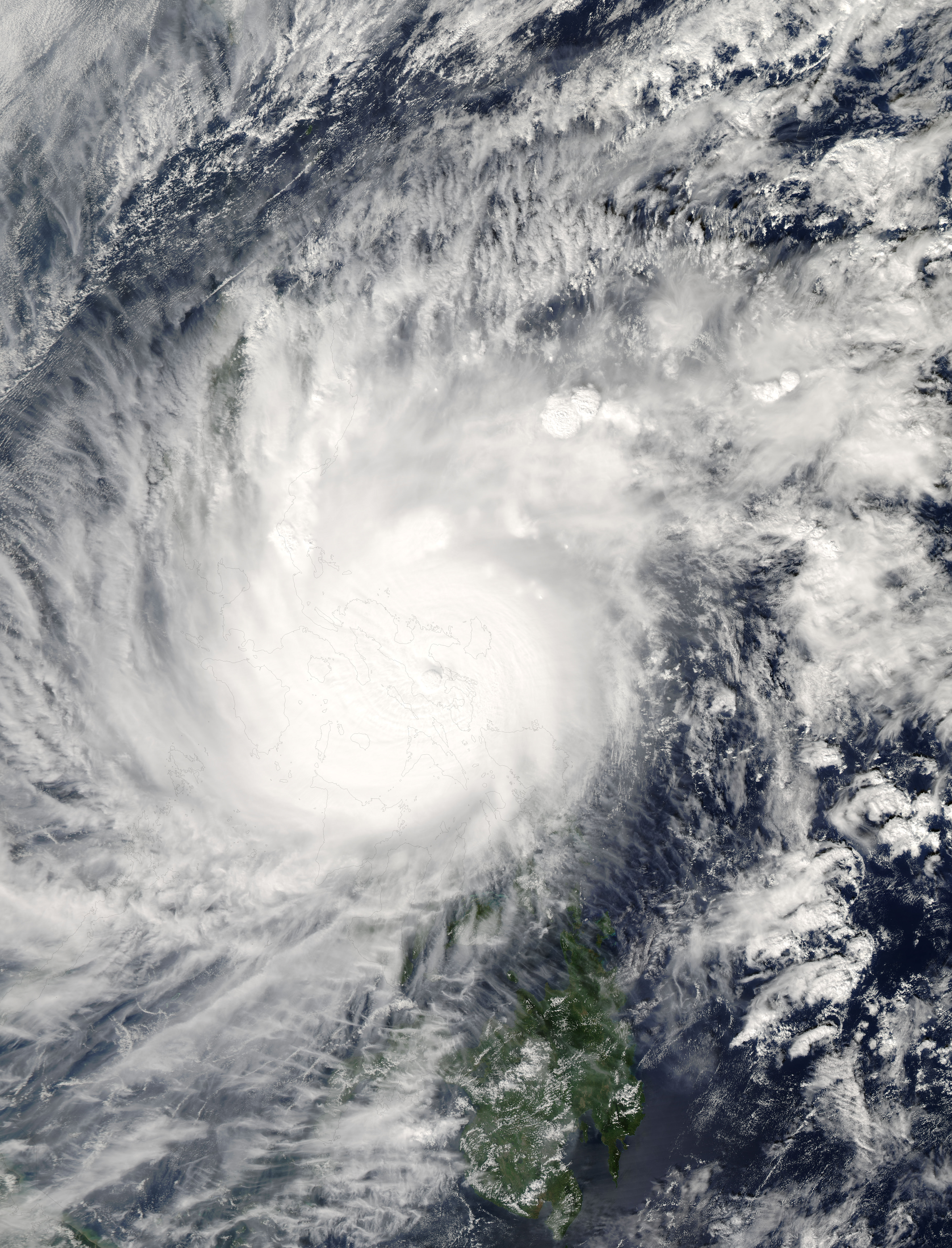
Typhoon Durian on November 30, making landfall over the Philippines.

The Bicol region, where Durian first struck, is located at the southeastern portion of the Philippine island of Luzon, and is affected by an average of 8.4 tropical cyclones per year. Before Durian made its damaging landfall in the Philippines, the Philippine Atmospheric, Geophysical and Astronomical Services Administration (PAGASA) issued various tropical cyclone warnings and watches, including Public Storm Warning Signal #4 for Catanduanes, Albay, and both Camarines Sur and Norte provinces; this is the highest warning signal, in which winds of over 100 km/h (60 mph) were expected. The Philippines' National Disaster Coordinating Council issued severe weather bulletins and advisories, and overall, 25 provinces in the archipelago were placed on storm alert. Residents in warning areas were advised of the potential for storm surge, flash flooding, and landslides.

The severe threat of the typhoon prompted over 1.3 million people to evacuate their homes, many of whom stayed in the 909 storm shelters. Officials advised residents in low-lying areas to seek higher grounds. School classes in Sorsogon and in Northern and Eastern Samar were suspended, and many buildings opened up as storm shelters. In Naga City, about 1,500 citizens left for emergency shelters. 1,000 were evacuated elsewhere in the region, including 120 in the capital city of Manila and more than 800 in Legazpi City. The threat of the typhoon caused ferry, bus, and airline services to be canceled, stranding thousands of people for several days. All shipping traffic was halted in the Mimaropa region. The Philippine Coast Guard grounded all vessels on open waters, stranding around 4,000 ferry passengers in Quezon province. PAGASA turned off its weather radar in Virac to prevent damage.

=== Vietnam ===
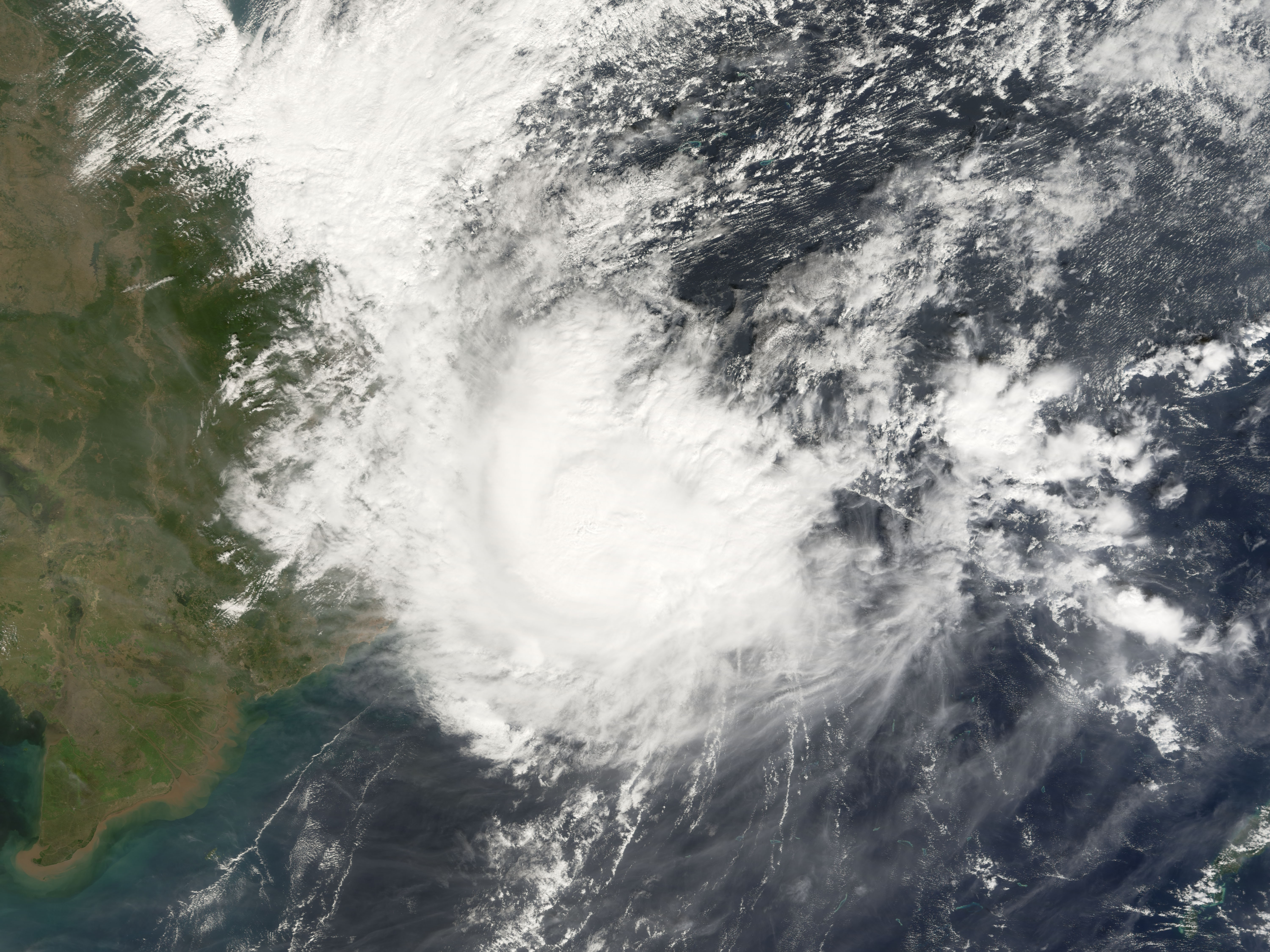
Typhoon Durian approaching Vietnam on December 4

On November 30, while the typhoon was over the Philippines, the Central Committee for Flood and Storm Control and the National Committee for Search and Rescue sent telegraphs advising of the typhoon to search and rescue teams stationed along the entire coast of the country (Quảng Ninh province to Cà Mau). All provinces along the South China Sea were advised to assist an estimated 14,585 vessels in the path of the storm. All craft were later banned from leaving harbors. Requests were also made to neighboring countries to allow Vietnamese fishermen to take refuge in their ports. Strong wind warnings were disseminated to residents between Phú Yên and Bà Rịa–Vũng Tàu provinces by December 2. These areas, as well as the inland provinces of Đắk Lắk, Lâm Đồng, and Bình Phước redirected all focus on the typhoon and the potential for life-threatening flash flooding. Evacuation orders for southern provinces were issued by December 3, with Deputy Prime Minister Nguyễn Sinh Hùng stating, "the evacuation must be completed by Monday morning [December 4]." Threatening an area not frequented by typhoons, many residents did not heed warnings as weather conditions ahead of the storm were calm. Approximately 6,800 people in Ninh Thuận province complied with the evacuation orders; however, officials requested the assistance of the Vietnamese Army to relocate roughly 90,000 people. Following an unpredicted southerly shift in the storm's track towards the Mekong Delta, Hung later urged residents and officials to prepare for the storm, such that "all provinces should prepare so that we do not have another Linda."

== Impact ==
=== Yap ===
Early in its duration, Durian produced light winds on Yap in the Caroline Islands, gusting to 56 km/h (35 mph), as well as light rainfall totaling 52 mm (2.0 in). Ahead of the storm, the National Weather Service on Guam issued a tropical storm warning for various islands in Yap State.

=== Philippines ===
Deadliest Philippine typhoons
Rank	Storm	Season	Fatalities	Ref.
1	Yolanda (Haiyan)	2013	6,300	
2	Uring (Thelma)	1991	5,101–8,000	
3	Pablo (Bopha)	2012	1,901	
4	"Angela"	1867	1,800	
5	Winnie	2004	1,593	
6	"October 1897"	1897	1,500	
7	Nitang (Ike)	1984	1,426	
8	Reming (Durian)	2006	1,399	
9	Frank (Fengshen)	2008	1,371	(Note: The death and missing columns includes deaths caused by Typhoon Fengshen (Frank), in the MV Princess of the Stars disaster.)
10	Sendong (Washi)	2011	1,292–2,546	

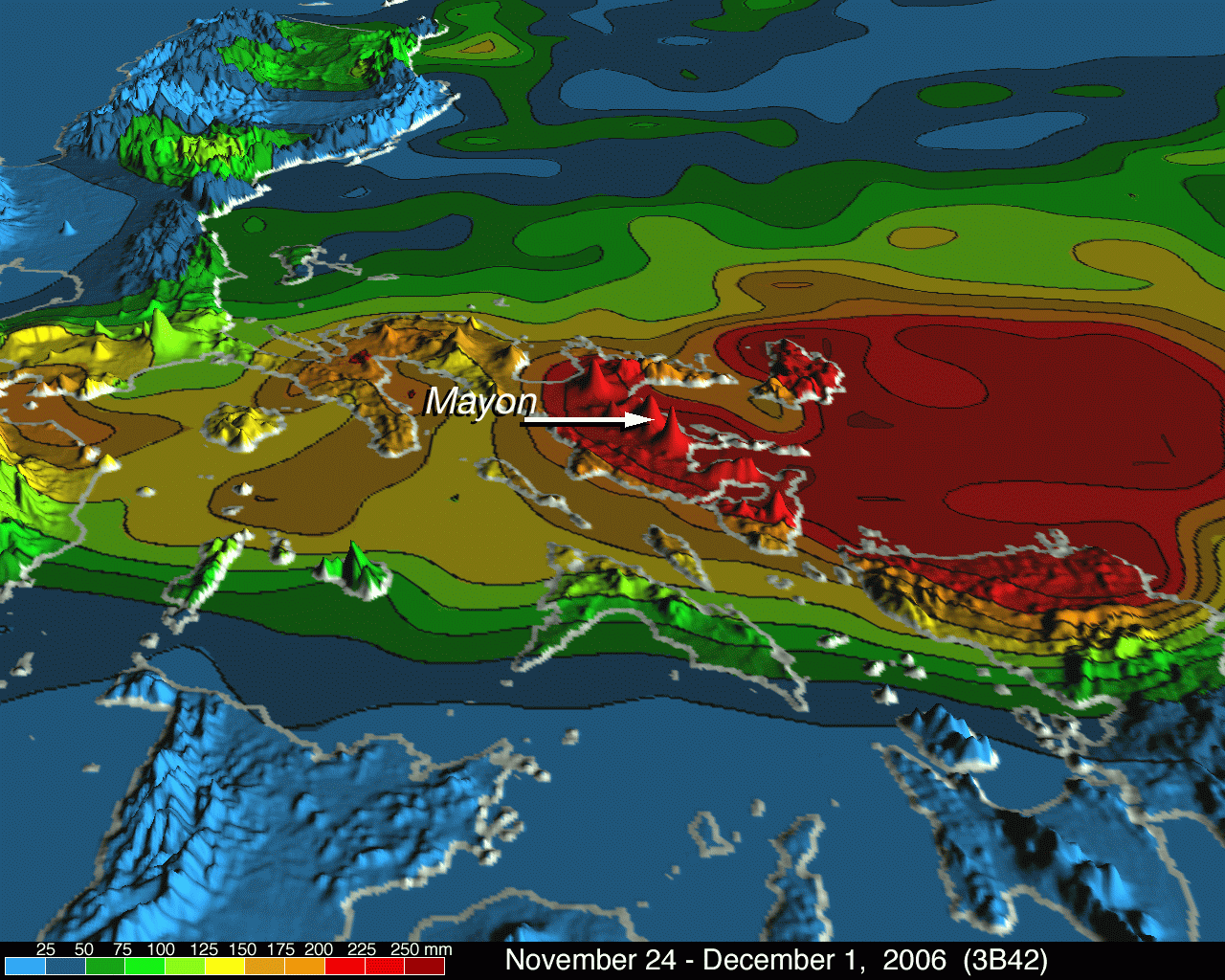
Satellite-derived rainfall totals due to Durian for the period November 24 to December 1, 2006, for the Central Philippines. Rainfall totals exceeding 200 mm (~8 inches) are shown in red and extend from the western Philippine Sea across southern sections of Luzon, Catanduanes Island, and northern Samar.

Typhoon Durian affected about 3.5 million people in the Philippines, of whom about 120,000 were left homeless. Durian damaged 588,037 houses, including 228,436 that were destroyed, many of which were made out of wood. Across the country, the storm wrecked 5,685 schools, estimated at US$63.5 million in damage. The Bicol Region accounted for 79% of the damaged schools, affecting around 357,400 children. Damage was estimated at ₱5.45 billion (PHP, US$110 million). (Note: The total was originally reported in Philippine pesos. Total converted via the Oanda Corporation website.) As of December 27, 2006, the death toll stood at 734, with 762 missing. The International Disaster Database listed 1,399 deaths in the Philippines related to Durian, making it the second deadliest natural disaster in 2006 after an earthquake in Indonesia.

While crossing the Philippines, Durian dropped 466 mm (18.3 in) of rainfall at Legazpi, Albay in 24 hours, including an hourly total of 135 mm (5.3 in). The 24 hour total was the highest in 40 years for a station in the Bicol region. Heavy rainfall caused rivers and irrigation canals to exceed their banks. Many creeks and small streams were flooded in the Bicol region. Gusts were estimated as high as 260 km/h (160 mph).

While the typhoon moved through the country, it caused complete power outages in Albay, Sorsogon, Camarines Sur, and Camarines Norte, affecting tens of thousands of residents. Initially, disrupted communications prevented details about the damage in the worst struck areas. The worst of the storm effects were in Albay, Camarines Sur, Catanduanes, Mindoro, and Quezon. On Catanduanes Island, Durian destroyed about half of the houses in the capital city of Virac. The powerful winds of the typhoon blew away houses and uprooted trees, All of the trees in Bacagay were knocked down, affecting the livelihood of half of the residents. Throughout the country, about 30,000 ha (74,000 acres) of rice fields were destroyed, accounting for 65,481 metric tons of corn; 19,420 metric tons of rice were also damaged. However, the crops were already harvested, so the storm's agriculture effects were minor. The storm also wrecked 1,200 fishing boats, severely affecting the local fishing industry, and killed many livestock.

==== Mayon Volcano ====
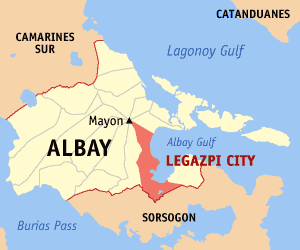
Map of Legazpi within Albay province, in relation to Mayon Volcano

The eye of Durian passed near Mayon Volcano as it struck the Bicol region. In the mountainous region, a process known as orographic lift produced heavier rainfall than near the coast, with totals possibly as high as 600 mm (24 in). On November 30, the rainfall became very heavy and prolonged, saturating the soil. Lahars – a type of landslide originating from a volcanic ash – formed quickly along the southern and eastern rims of Mayon Volcano, which had produced a fresh layer of ash in August 2006. The lahars destroyed dykes and dams meant to contain the debris flow, which were not designed to prevent major landslides. Warnings were issued for potential lahars, but the rapid development of the debris flows as well as power outages meant populations did not receive adequate warning. Initially, the lahars were contained by a layer of grasslands, although the unstable nature of the volcanic soil caused the grounds to collapse. Within 21 minutes, the lahars descended Mayon Volcano, quickly covering and wrecking six communities. After the initial series of lahars, further ash flow descended to the ocean to the north of Mayon Volcano. Areas around the volcano were inundated with 1.5 m (5 ft) of floodwaters. Widespread flooding was also reported in Legazpi City.

North of Legazpi, the ash flow covered or damaged portions of the Pan-Philippine Highway. In the small barangay – small town – of Maipon, nearby streams coalesced into a valley filled with muddy waters. The landslide arrived quickly and washed away or destroyed houses in the path. Several people died while attempting to cross to higher grounds. Similar conditions affected nearby Daraga, where 149 people died. Around that city, the landslide reached 2 m (6.6 ft) deep and 307 m (1,007 ft) wide, enough to cover 3 story buildings, while floods enlarged the nearby Yawa River by 600%. About 13,000 families had to leave their homes due to the landslides. Many roads and bridges were wrecked around the volcano, which halted transportation and impacted relief work.

In Albay province alone, there were 604 deaths and 1,465 people who sustained injuries. Damage in the province totaled $71 million (USD). The storm also damaged 702 of the 704 schools in the province.

=== Vietnam ===
Strong winds have been recorded at several locations in Vietnam due to Typhoon Durian. A weather station on Phú Quý Island reported sustained wind speeds of 122 km/h (76 mph) and gusts reaching 173 km/h (107 mph), while another station in Vũng Tàu City [vi] recorded wind gusts of 126 km/h (78 mph). Strong winds capsized several boats offshore Vietnam, killing two with one missing. In Bình Thuận Province alone, 820 boats sank, and throughout the country 896 fishing boats sank.

Heavy rainfall from the typhoon destroyed 22 schools and 1,120 houses in Bình Thuận Province. Strong winds from Durian blew off the roofs of about 500 houses in Bà Rịa–Vũng Tàu province. Throughout the nation, the passage of the typhoon destroyed 34,000 homes, with an additional 166,000 damaged. Typhoon Durian killed 85 in the country and injured 1,379 others. Total damages were 7.234 trillion VND (US$450 million).

== Aftermath ==
=== Philippines ===
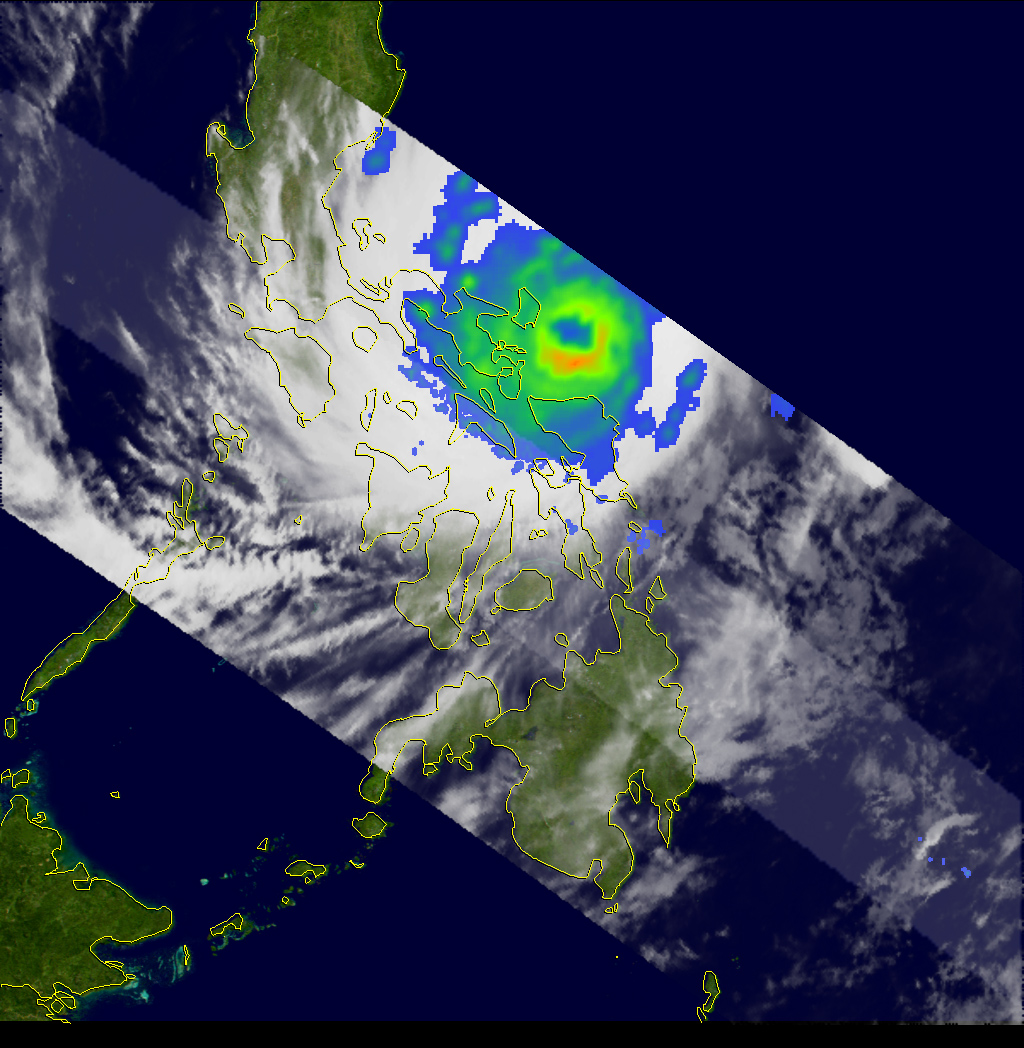
Typhoon Durian Tropical Rainfall Measuring Mission (TRMM) image. It shows the well-defined eye of the storm and the clouds surrounding it.

On December 3, Philippine President Gloria Macapagal Arroyo declared a state of national calamity, due to the successive impacts of typhoons Xangsane, Cimaron, and Durian. Arroyo ordered the immediate release of 1 billion Philippine pesos ($20.7 million, 2006 USD) for relief in areas affected by typhoons Durian, Xangsane, and Cimaron. This relief fund was increased to 3.6 billion pesos ($74.8 million, 2006 USD) on December 6, including an additional 150 million pesos ($3.1 million) for power grid repair. The government used over ₱500 million (PHP) from their Countryside Development Fund. Soon after Durian exited the country, workers began restoring power lines and clearing debris and trees from roads, which was required before relief agencies reached the hardest hit areas. As of December 1, 3,316 families had fled their homes to storm shelters. Immediately after the storm's landfall, reports of deaths or injuries had not yet reached the media centres. As officials made contact with the hardest hit areas, the death toll quickly rose to 190 by December 1, and to 720 by two weeks later.

On December 17, the Philippine government issued a $46 million appeal to the United Nations for financial assistance coping with Durian. This was after the country already depleted its yearly emergency funding for disasters. In response, various United Nations' departments provided about $2.6 million in emergency funding, and by late December 2006, 14 countries had provided donations to the Philippines. By the end of January, only 7.1% of the appeal was raised. By the end of April 2007, four Asian countries – China, Indonesia, Malaysia, and Singapore – donated ₱54 million (US$2.2 million) worth of emergency supplies, such as clothing, medicine, and food. Various companies and local organizations donated to the relief effort, such as medicine, food, water, transport supplies, clothes, and money. Individuals and corporations donated ₱68 million (US$1.4 million) in cash and supplies. The international response came shortly after the calamity status was declared. On December 3, Canada released $1 million (US$860,000) for local relief through its embassy in Manila and through the International Red Cross and Red Crescent Movement. UNICEF donated 4,000 packages containing food, mattresses, and blankets, and UNOCHA donated $1– 2 million (USD) for relief supplies. Spain donated $250,000 (USD) and sent medical teams, medicines, food, and supplies to affected areas. The United States donated $250,000 plus supplies through the USAID program, and the Filipino community on Saipan contributed cash, food, and supplies. Australia released $1 million (US$792,000) through its AusAID program. Indonesia sent two C-130 Hercules aircraft to Legazpi City, carrying a total of 25 tons of food, medicine, and clothing valued at 1.17 billion Indonesian rupiah (US$129,000). Japan pledged tents, blankets, generators, and water management equipment through the Japan International Cooperation Agency. Malaysia donated 20 tons of food and medicines, and Singapore sent two batches of supplies valued at $50,000 (USD) through Singapore Airlines. The Republic of Korea pledged $100,000 (USD) cash, while the People's Republic of China pledged $200,000 (USD). Israel donated $7,500 (USD), mostly in medicines and medical supplies.

The Red Cross, which responded to the repeated storms of 2006, launched an appeal that raised $9.67 million for the Philippines. In March 2009, the agency completed the missions responding to the 2006 storms and transferred the remaining funds to help repair from Typhoon Fengshen in 2008. The International Organization for Migration developed the Humanitarian Response Monitoring System in response to problems in the management of the aftermath of Durian, and also provided 12,750 metric tons of building supplies, medicine, and water in the storm's immediate aftermath. OXFAM built 242 latrines and 99 bath houses to ensure proper hygiene. The Tzu Chi Foundation set up a temporary medical camp in Tabaco to provide free health care to storm victims. The International Labour Organization built a livelihood center in February 2008 to help provide jobs to storm victims. The World Bank, in conjunction with the Philippines' National Power Corporation, funded a $21.6 million project to repair the damaged power lines in the typhoons' aftermath. The agencies also upgraded 118 electrical towers by 2008 to stabilize power supply during typhoons. As a result, there were minimal power outages during the passage of Tropical Storm Higos (Pablo) in 2008.

Beginning in January 2007, the United Nations Food and Agriculture Organization distributed about 150 packs of vegetable seeds and farm tools to displaced residents in three Bicol provinces, as part of the sustainable recovery program planned by the Philippine government for storm victims. By a year after the typhoon, farmers had regrown their rice and vegetables, utilizing a rebuilt irrigation system. The World Food Programme supplied fishermen with materials to rebuild damaged boats, allowing them to resume catching fish by May 2007. The agency also provided monthly food rations to displaced residents in Albay, totaling 294 tons of rice to about 6,000 families; however, the food distribution programs ended in December 2007, causing food shortages in the first few months of 2008 among those still displaced. UNICEF distributed 1,750 water purification tablets, along with jerrycans and water containers, to ensure access to clean water.

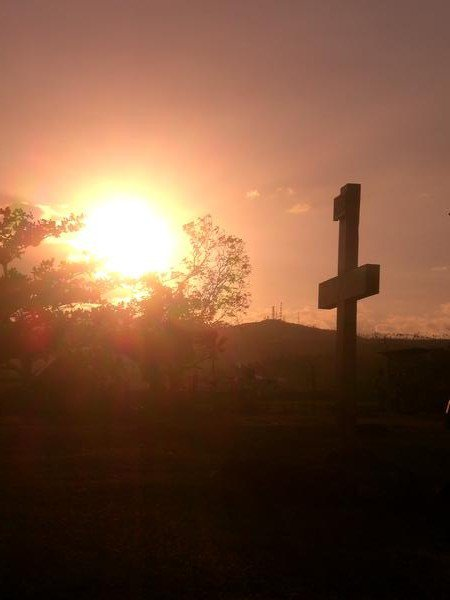
A cross stood in memory of the people who died from the mudslides in Albay after Durian

After the successive impacts of Xangsane and Durian caused widespread power outages, the Bicol region lost about $250 million in economic output. The unemployment rate in the Bicol region rose to about 30%, and many who retained their jobs earned less than before the storm. In the aftermath of Durian, all relief activities were coordinated through the Philippines' departments of Health and Social Welfare and Development. A fleet of over 200 vehicles transported relief supplies – food, construction materials, clothing, and medicine – to the Bicol region on December 12. The Philippine Air Force airlifted supplies and medical teams to Bicol and offshore Catanduanes, with the National Disaster Coordinating Council supplying 17,350 sacks of rice to those areas. The Departments of Social Welfare and Development and the Department of Health sent teams to help victims cope with stress and consoled the families of the deceased, aided by psychiatrists. The Department of Health also distributed tents and sleeping bags, provided vaccines to people in evacuation camps, and ensured proper burial of storm casualties. There was a minor outbreak of diarrhea in the evacuation camps that affected 142 people in Legazpi, and other evacuees were also ailed by the cold, coughing, and fever. Local governments in Albay worked to ensure areas retained clean water by using disinfectants and temporary latrines. The Philippine government provided ₱119 million (US$2.4 million) toward rebuilding the damaged schools in Albay, only 23% of the required cost to repair all of the schools.

The government assessed that about 35% of those who lost their houses had the resources to rebuild without assistance; this meant that 144,692 houses had to be rebuilt. Many of the storm victims left homeless resided in tent camps, schools, and temporary shelters, until more permanent buildings were built. The Red Cross housed about 60,000 people across ten provinces in temporary shelters. The Philippine government planned to quickly build more permanent homes, although there were difficulties in securing land and materials for the new housing. By March 2007, government and international agencies only provided 6.9% of the necessary homes, forcing people to stay in shelters longer than expected. By a year after the storm, over 10,000 families still stayed in transit camps in Albay and Camarines Sur. Various organizations helped the homeless secure housing. The government of Italy funded a ₱26 million (US$525,000) project to rebuild 180 houses in Albay. The Italian government also helped build new livelihood centers to provide jobs, provided new boats, and donated about 80,000 coconut seeds to replant trees. In the eight months after Durian struck, the Philippine National Red Cross, in conjunction with the International Red Cross, delivered building supplies to about 12,000 families to repair their homes or build new ones. The organizations encouraged residents to rebuild houses away from vulnerable areas. The International Organization for Migration, in conjunction with the United States Agency for International Development, built 907 homes and new community centers. The Philippine government released ₱76 million ($1.5 million) in funds to build 1,089 houses. UNICEF provided emergency funding to rebuild 50 daycare centers that were damaged by the typhoon. Habitat for Humanity helped repair about 1,200 homes, build about 2,000 new houses, and rebuilt four schools in Sorsogon.

Around Mayon Volcano, officials enacted search and rescue missions for victims affected by landslides. Workers quickly excavated lahar-filled valleys, bridges, and river beds to rebuild dykes. Farmers quickly regrew damaged crops, while schools and homes were cleaned and rebuilt. Stronger concrete dykes were built around populated communities. The government developed relocation plans for three landslide-prone areas in Albay. In 2011, the Regional Development Council approved a budget to construct additional dams along the Mayon Volcano to prevent the deadly floods and landslides that occurred during Durian. Dams were scheduled to be constructed around the volcano after a 1981 study, but these were delayed due to budget constraints.

=== Vietnam ===
In Vietnam, which had recently been affected by Typhoon Xangsane, the national government released 150 billion Vietnamese đồng ($9 million, 2006 USD) in food and supplies to families in affected areas. The United States donated $100,000 (USD), and its Oxfam organisation donated $200,000 (USD) to the most affected provinces. The International Red Cross and Red Crescent Movement launched an emergency appeal for $2.47 million (USD) to support the efforts of the Vietnam Red Cross, which distributed over 2,000 packets of supplies and over 2 tonnes of rice, medicine, and clothes.

=== Retirement ===
The 39th session of the United Nations Economic and Social Commission for Asia and the Pacific/World Meteorological Organization's Typhoon Committee met in Manila, Philippines from December 4–9, soon after the onslaught of the floods from Durian. The committee's regional director stated in their report, "I wish to extend WMO’s sincere condolences and sympathy to your Government and to the Philippine people who were adversely affected by the past typhoons." During the session, the committee retired the name Durian, and replaced it with Mangkhut in 2008.

PAGASA also retired the local name Reming in 2006 and replaced it with Ruby for the 2010 season.

== See also ==
- Weather of 2006
- Tropical cyclones in 2006
- List of Philippine typhoons (2000–present)
