= Typhoon Chebi (2006) =

Pacific typhoon in 2006

Typhoon Chebi (Queenie)
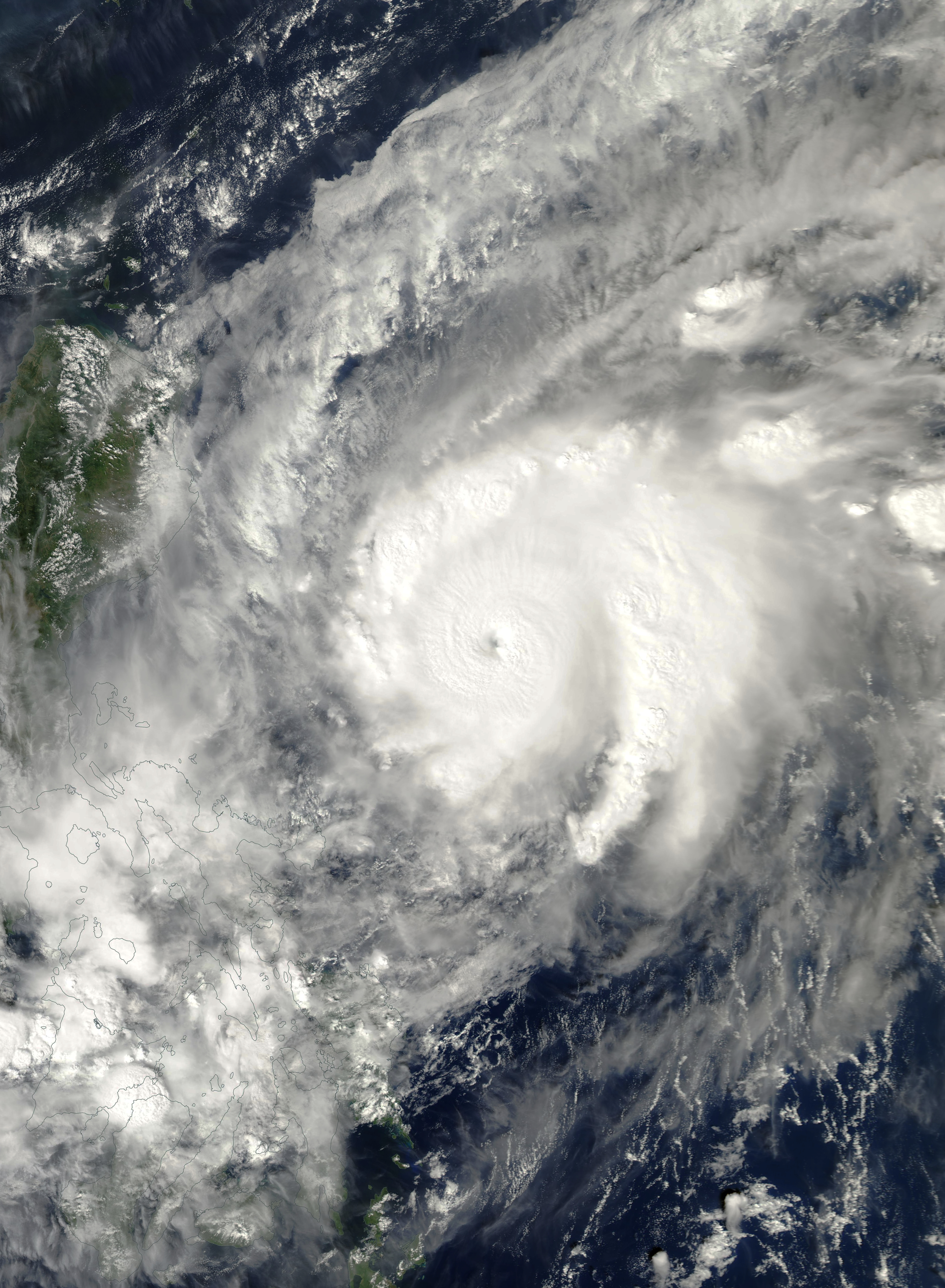
- Typhoon Chebi approaching the Philippines on November 10

Meteorological history
- Formed: November 8, 2006
- Dissipated: November 14, 2006

Very strong typhoon
- 10-minute sustained (JMA)
- Highest winds: 185 km/h (115 mph)
- Lowest pressure: 925 hPa (mbar); 27.32 inHg

Category 4-equivalent typhoon
- 1-minute sustained (SSHWS/JTWC)
- Highest winds: 230 km/h (145 mph)
- Lowest pressure: 916 hPa (mbar); 27.05 inHg

Overall effects
- Fatalities: 1 total
- Damage: Unknown
- Areas affected: Philippines, Hong Kong, Vietnam
- IBTrACS
- Part of the 2006 Pacific typhoon season

Typhoon Chebi, (Note: The name Chebi (Korean: 제비, [ˈt͡ɕe̞(ː)bi]) was contributed by South Korea and refers to the barn swallow (Hirundo rustica) in Korean.) known in the Philippines as Super Typhoon Queenie, was a powerful typhoon that impacted Luzon during early November 2006. Chebi is the third typhoon since Typhoon Xangsane to hit the country destructively. The 30th tropical depression developed east of the Mariana Islands on October 31 as a weak disturbance. The system was dubbed into a tropical depression on November 8, until both the JMA and PAGASA upgraded it to a tropical storm on November 9. Chebi rapidly intensified to a Category 4 typhoon the next day and made landfall over northern Philippines on November 11. The system finally dissipated near Hong Kong and Vietnam on November 14. The name Chebi would be corrected following this season in 2007 and be spelled as Jebi.

== Meteorological history ==
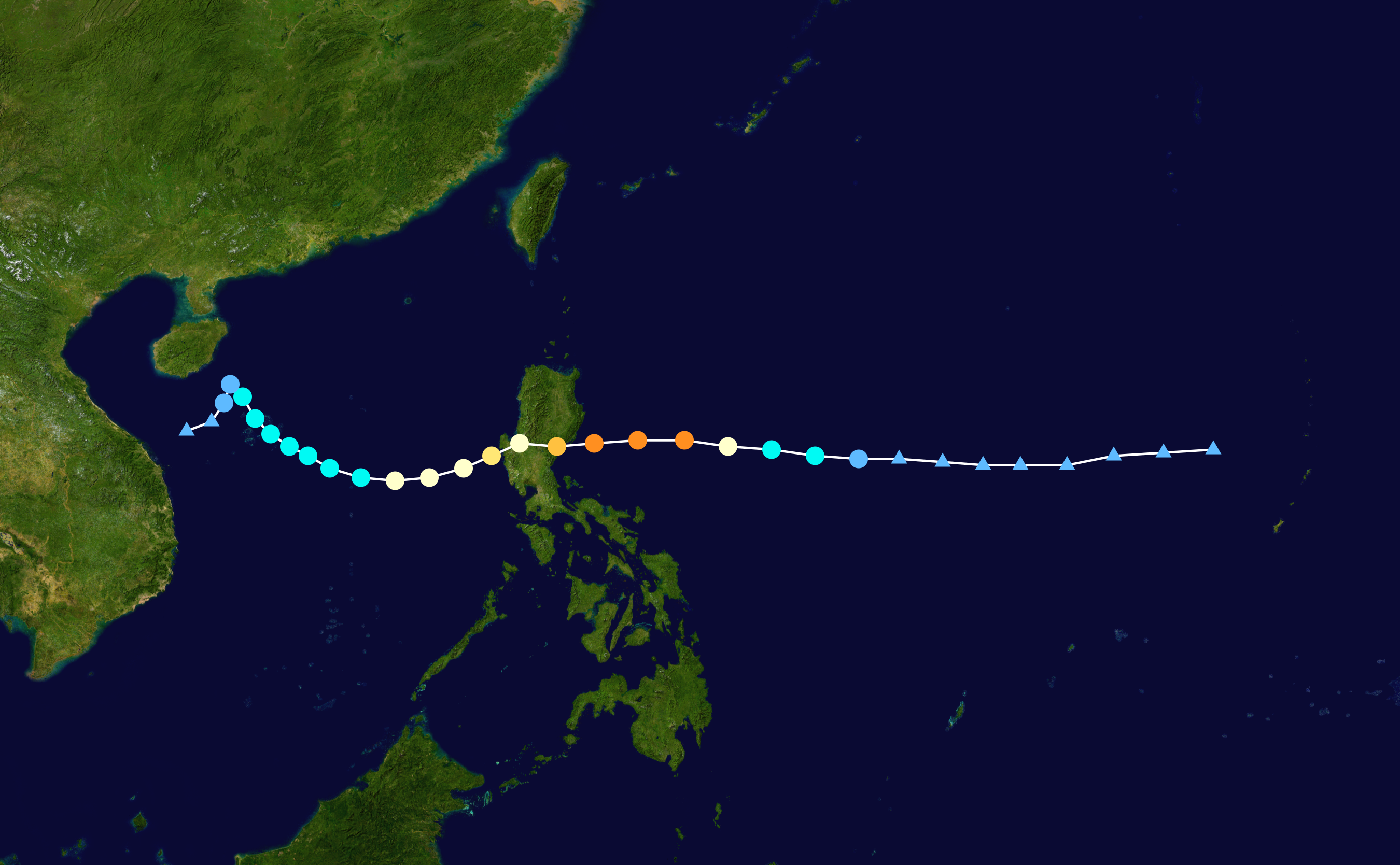
Map plotting the storm's track and intensity, according to the Saffir–Simpson scale Map key Saffir–Simpson scale Tropical depression (≤38 mph, ≤62 km/h) Tropical storm (39–73 mph, 63–118 km/h) Category 1 (74–95 mph, 119–153 km/h) Category 2 (96–110 mph, 154–177 km/h) Category 3 (111–129 mph, 178–208 km/h) Category 4 (130–156 mph, 209–251 km/h) Category 5 (≥157 mph, ≥252 km/h) Unknown Storm type Tropical cyclone Subtropical cyclone Extratropical cyclone, remnant low, tropical disturbance, or monsoon depression

An area of disturbed weather developed east of the Mariana Islands on October 31, and moved west-northwestward over the next week without any increase in organization due to an unfavorable environment, until November 6, when it encountered more favorable conditions, and the Japan Meteorological Agency declared it a tropical depression on November 8. The Joint Typhoon Warning Center issued a Tropical Cyclone Formation Alert on the system later that day, and PAGASA named the system Tropical Depression Queenie shortly after. The JTWC classified it as Tropical Depression 23W early on November 9. According to the JTWC, lack of equatorial outflow prevented rapid intensification of the system. Later that day, the JMA upgraded it to a tropical storm named it Chebi. The JTWC and PAGASA both followed suit later that day. In the same time, Chebi started to underwent a 24-hour period of rapid deepening, with an 85 millibar drop until mid of November 10. Early on November 10, the JMA upgraded Chebi to a severe tropical storm as it continued to move west towards the Philippines, following a similar track as Typhoon Cimaron earlier in the season. Just hours later, the JMA upgraded Chebi from severe tropical storm with 10-minute sustained winds of 55 knots to a typhoon with winds of 95 knots, with a pressure decrease of 40 hPa over three hours.

The JTWC followed suit, upping Chebi from a tropical storm with 1-minute sustained winds of 55 knots to a Category 4-equivalent typhoon. Nearly the same time after that, Chebi reached its peak intensity with 10-minute sustained winds of 175 km/h (110 mph); 1-min maximum sustained winds of 230 km/h (145 mph) and a minimum barometric pressure of 925 millibars. PAGASA raised Public Storm Warning Signal No. 4 for three provinces in Luzon, making Chebi the second storm (Typhoon Cimaron served as the first one that year) in as many weeks to force a Signal #4. After rapidly deepening, Chebi slightly weakened as it approached the Philippines. It made its first landfall near Casiguran, Aurora early on November 11, crossed Lingayen Gulf and its second landfall on Barangay Lucap, Alaminos about 8 hours later.

Encountering dry air entrainment and increased vertical wind shear in the South China Sea, Chebi began to gradually weaken to a severe tropical storm on November 12. It continued to weaken, turning northwards towards Hainan, and was downgraded to a tropical storm the next day. On November 14, the JMA issued its last advisory on the dissipating tropical depression. The JTWC issued its final warning later that same day as Chebi dissipated under the strong shear.

== Preparations and impact ==
=== Philippines ===
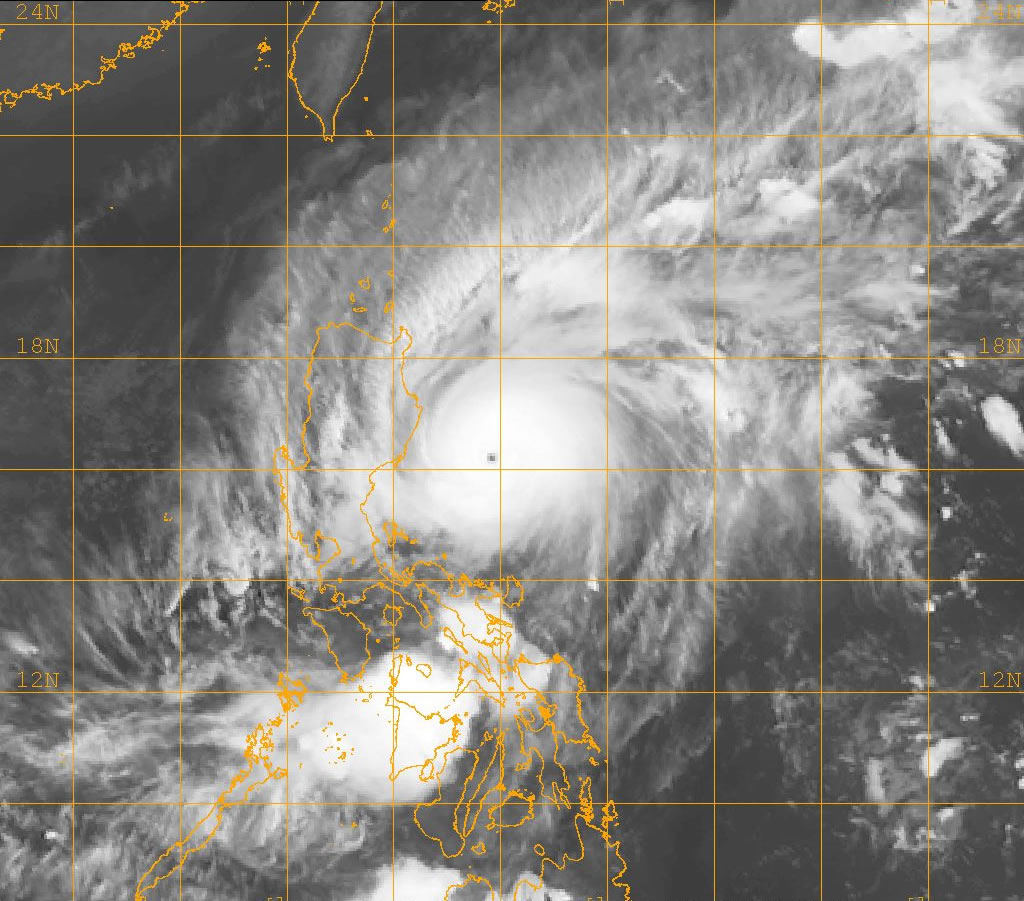
Typhoon Chebi at peak intensity on November 10

Typhoon Chebi entered the Philippine Area of Responsibility (PAR) on November 10 and was named Queenie by PAGASA. On November 11, just after its peak intensity, Chebi made landfall over Aurora, Philippines near Casiguran. Public Storm Warning Signal #2, meaning winds extending from 60 to 100 kp/h, is up over southern Isabela, Quirino, Aurora, northern Quezon and Polillo Island. Cagayan, Isabela, Ifugao, Nueva Vizcaya, Bulacan, Quezon, Camarines provinces and Catanduanes have been placed under Signal #1. On November 13, Chebi exited the PAR with both the PAGASA and NDRRMC stopped warning on the system. The PNRC is also preparing relief supplies to be distributed to families in the barangays of Dibulo and Digomased where an estimated 300 families have been evacuated within the Municipality of Dinapegue. However, initial actions have included the establishment of a tent camp in the city of Calamba, one hour south of Manila, set up in three days from November 8 to 11 to accommodate 87 families. The camp's capacity is 300 families. The ICRC provided two emergency water storage bladders, one for 10,000 litres and one for 5,000 litres. The camp is managed by the city administration, which is finishing constructions of latrines, showers, cooking and laundry facilities. About 8,300 people who evacuated flooded villages in San Jose have returned home, the civil defense office said.

All told, the typhoon caused further casualties as well as damage caused by the earlier Typhoon Cimaron. Landslides, overflowing rivers, toppled trees and power lines blocked several roads to Casiguran and Dinapigue town in nearby Isabela province. Strong winds destroyed two houses and damaged a dozen others in Casiguran. The OCD said most of the floodwaters in the area have receded by early of November 12, but some rice crops were damaged in San Jose city in Nueva Ecija province where some farms were submerged under about 1.2 meters (four feet) of water. A total of 1,676 houses were damaged in Dipaculao, Casiguran and Dinalungan, Aurora Province. In Aurora Province, it caused floods, cutting the province's road system, as well as zero visibility, further isolating it from relief efforts. Initial assessments from chapters in Aurora, Isabela and Nueva Ecija say 4,624 families have had their homes destroyed or damaged. There have also been reports of power outages and roads once again being cut off. A total of 3,958 families or 21,250 persons were affected in 38 barangays of 7 municipalities and 1 city in the provinces of Isabela, Aurora and Nueva Ecija. There were 10 persons reported injured in Casiguran, Aurora. One person was reported dead in San Jose City, Nueva Ecija with five missing in Sabang, Baler, Aurora.

=== Vietnam ===
Meteorologists predicted the typhoon would start building up and heading directly west across the Eastern Sea by evening of November 12. Chebi was located several kilometers east of Luzon in the Philippines and was reportedly generating Category 14 to 15 winds (150–183 km/h) around the center. On November 13, at that stage the Central Hydro-Meteorological Center predicted the storm would steer west-northwest at 10–15 km/h and bring winds gusting up to 150 km/h. If the meteorologists have got it right in their latest prediction, the eighth storm to set its sights on Viet Nam this year should begin weakening in the next 24 hours. Chebi had weakened into a tropical depression on November 14 and was no longer threatened the central region, Vietnam's National Hydrometeorological Forecast Center said. Even so, Vietnam's eighth storm of the year, Chebi, was strong enough to produce waves as high as four meters around the Hoang Sa Islands in the Eastern Sea.

== See also ==
- Other tropical cyclones named Chebi
- Other tropical cyclones named Queenie
- Other typhoons that impacted the Philippines in 2006:
  - Typhoon Chanchu
  - Typhoon Xangsane
  - Typhoon Cimaron
  - Typhoon Durian
  - Typhoon Utor
- Typhoon Elsie (1989) - Had a similar track, though had a stronger impact
- Typhoon Nalgae (2011) - Had a similar track and intensity, also affected Hong Kong
