= Typhoon Elsie (1989) =

Pacific typhoon in 1989

Typhoon Elsie (Tasing)
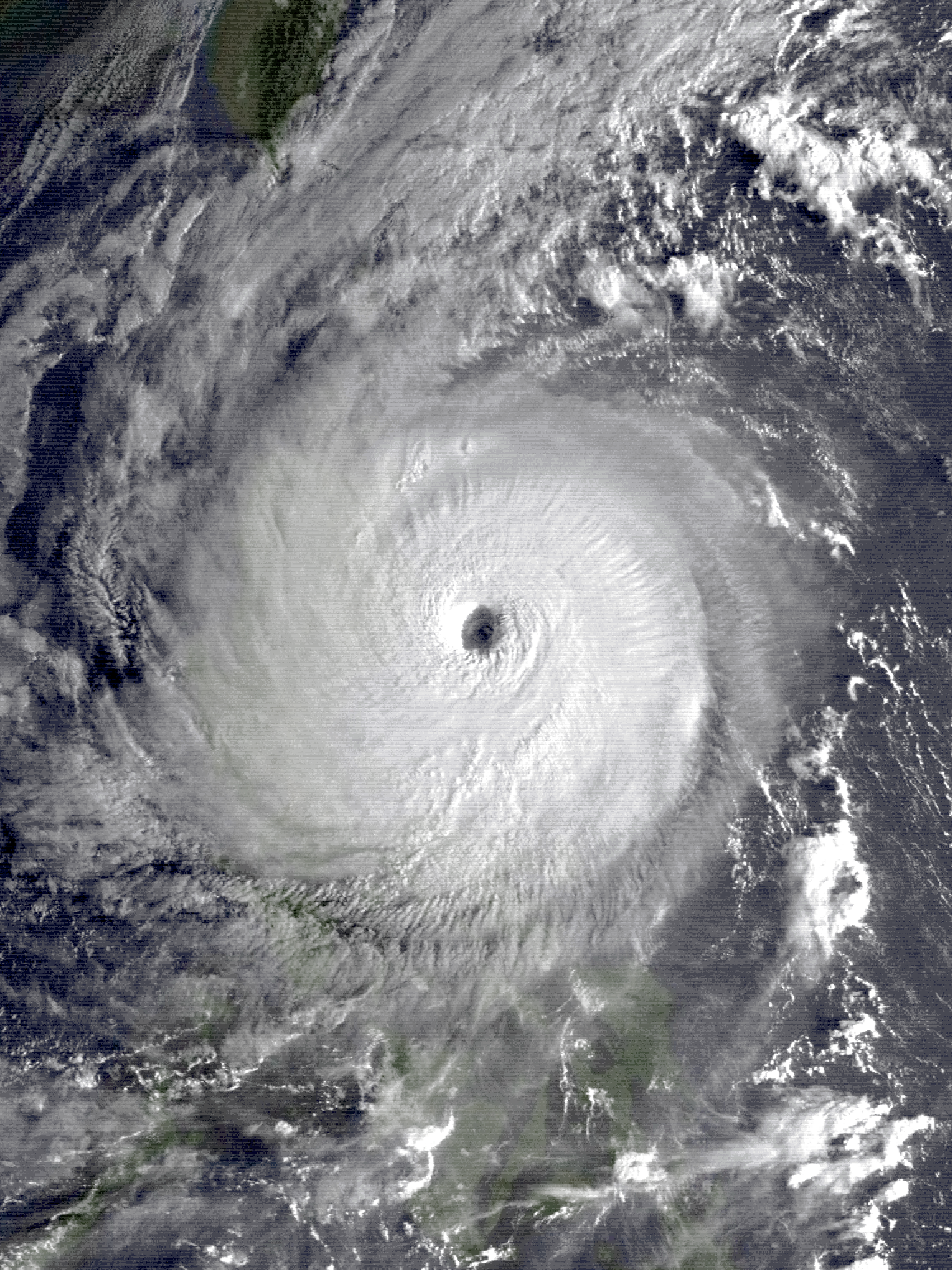
- Elsie at peak intensity nearing landfall over the Philippines on October 18

Meteorological history
- Formed: October 13, 1989
- Dissipated: October 22, 1989

Very strong typhoon
- 10-minute sustained (JMA)
- Highest winds: 185 km/h (115 mph)
- Lowest pressure: 915 hPa (mbar); 27.02 inHg

Category 5-equivalent super typhoon
- 1-minute sustained (SSHWS/JTWC)
- Highest winds: 260 km/h (160 mph)
- Lowest pressure: 898 hPa (mbar); 26.52 inHg

Overall effects
- Fatalities: 47 direct
- Injuries: 363
- Damage: $35.4 million
- Areas affected: Philippines, China, Vietnam
- IBTrACS
- Part of the 1989 Pacific typhoon season

Typhoon Elsie, known in the Philippines as Super Typhoon Tasing, was one of the most intense known tropical cyclones to make landfall in the Philippines. A powerful Category 5 super typhoon, Elsie formed out of a tropical disturbance on October 13, 1989, and initially moved relatively slowly in an area of weak steering currents. On October 15, the storm underwent a period of rapid intensification, attaining an intensity that corresponds to a Category 3 hurricane on the Saffir–Simpson hurricane scale. After taking a due west track towards the northern Philippines, the storm intensified further, becoming a Category 5 super typhoon hours before making landfall in Luzon. After moving inland, the typhoon rapidly weakened to a tropical storm. Once back over water in the South China Sea, wind shear prevented re-intensifcation. Elsie eventually made landfall in Vietnam on October 22 and dissipated the following day over Laos.

In the Philippines, Elsie worsened the situation already left in the wakes of typhoons Angela and Dan. Although it was stronger than the previous two, Elsie caused far less damage due to the relatively sparse population in the area of landfall. During the storm's passage, 47 people were killed and another 363 were injured. Damages throughout the country amounted to $35.4 million and roughly 332,000 people were left homeless.

== Meteorological history ==
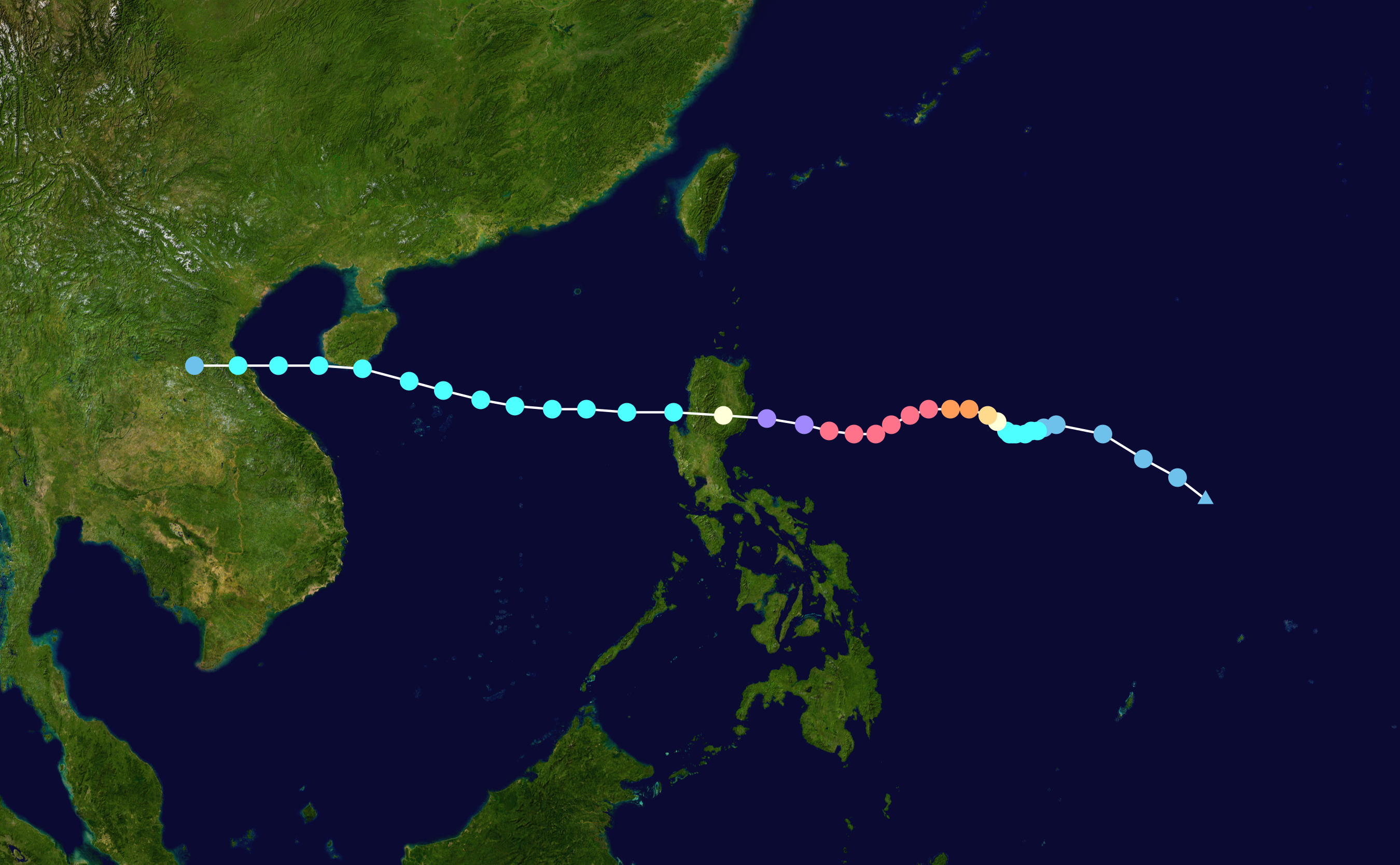
Map plotting the storm's track and intensity, according to the Saffir–Simpson scale Map key Saffir–Simpson scale Tropical depression (≤38 mph, ≤62 km/h) Tropical storm (39–73 mph, 63–118 km/h) Category 1 (74–95 mph, 119–153 km/h) Category 2 (96–110 mph, 154–177 km/h) Category 3 (111–129 mph, 178–208 km/h) Category 4 (130–156 mph, 209–251 km/h) Category 5 (≥157 mph, ≥252 km/h) Unknown Storm type Tropical cyclone Subtropical cyclone Extratropical cyclone, remnant low, tropical disturbance, or monsoon depression

Super Typhoon Elsie, the third typhoon to impact the Philippines within a 12-day span during 1989, originated from a tropical upper tropospheric trough (TUTT) over the western Pacific Ocean in mid-October. By October 13, a tropical disturbance developed out of the system roughly 1,240 kilometres (770 mi) east-northeast of Manila, Philippines. At this time, the Japan Meteorological Agency (JMA) began to monitor the system as a tropical depression. Located between two other TUTT cells, the disturbance's outflow was enhanced, allowing it to intensify. The Joint Typhoon Warning Center (JTWC) issued a Tropical Cyclone Formation Alert late on October 13. Early the following day, the disturbance was designated as Tropical Depression 30W as it began to stall in an area of weak steering currents between two subtropical highs.

Shortly after being declared a depression, the JTWC upgraded the system to a tropical storm, giving it the name Elsie. At the same time, the JMA also upgraded the depression to a tropical storm. By October 15, Elsie began to take a slow track to the west-northwest and intensified. Later that day, a short-wave trough passed to the north of the storm, again enhancing its outflow. This led to a period of rapid intensification, during which Elsie intensified from a tropical storm to the equivalent of a high-end Category 3 hurricane on the Saffir–Simpson hurricane scale in a 24-hour span. The JMA also upgraded Elsie to a typhoon, though they reported a much more gradual rate of intensification. After strengthening further to Category 4 intensity, maximum winds leveled out for most of October 17.

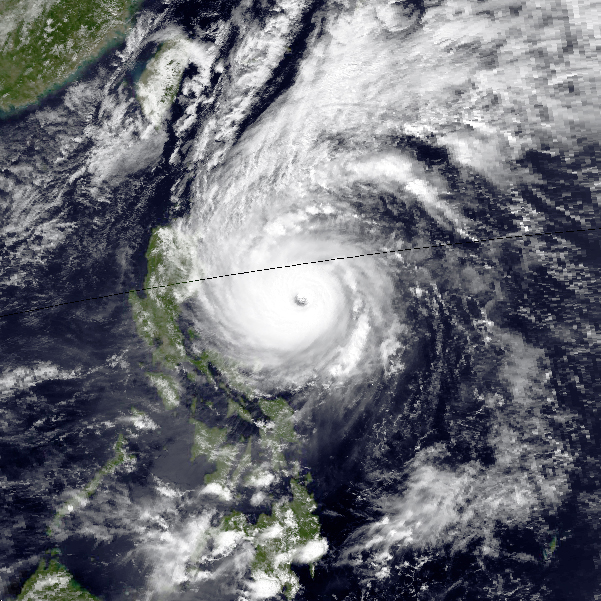
Typhoon Elsie approaching the Philippines on October 18

On October 18, another period of intensification took place as the storm neared the northern Philippines. Early in the day, Elsie was upgraded to a super typhoon, a storm with winds of at least 240 km/h (150 mph). Hours before making landfall in Luzon, the storm attained its peak intensity as a Category 5 super typhoon with winds of 260 km/h (160 mph) and a barometric pressure of 898 hPa (mbar). The peak intensity of Elsie was assessed by the JMA at the same time. They reported that the typhoon attained winds of 175 km/h (109 mph) 10-minute sustained) and a minimum pressure of 915 hPa (mbar). The center of Elsie crossed the Philippine coastline at around 0300 UTC on October 19.

Rapid weakening took place as the storm moved over the mountainous terrain of northern Luzon. Roughly nine hours after crossing the coastline, Elsie was downgraded to a tropical storm. The weakened storm continued its westward track as it entered the South China Sea along a monsoonal surge. This surge also helped to keep Elsie as a tropical storm due to increased wind shear over the northern portion of the cyclone. The JMA, unlike the JTWC, did not downgrade Elsie to a tropical storm until October 21. Failing to re-intensify, Elsie eventually made landfall in central Vietnam on October 22 and degenerated into a remnant-low-pressure system early the following day. The remnants of Elsie were monitored by the JTWC on satellite imagery for a short time until the former typhoon dissipated over Laos.

== Impact and aftermath ==
During the storm, roughly 50,500 people sought refuge in shelters set up across the country. Throughout the Philippines, 47 people were killed by the typhoon, mostly from drowning. Sixteen of these fatalities occurred in Isabela Province, where Elsie made landfall. Heavy rains triggered several landslides across mountainous areas of the country. High winds also created deadly air-borne debris, including roofing and tree limbs. Downed power lines across the northern provinces left most of Luzon without power. Officials stated that about 61,300 homes were either damaged or destroyed by Elsie in the Philippines. In the wake of the typhoon, roughly 332,000 people were left homeless. Damages sustained by agriculture amounted to ₱105 million ($2,253,702). In all, Typhoon Elsie killed 47 people and injured 363 others in the Philippines, and left roughly $35.4 million in damages.

Although Elsie brushed Hainan Island in China and made landfall in northern Vietnam, little damage was reported in these regions. In addition to damages caused by Brian, Angela and Dan, roughly ¥1.9 billion ($278.3 million) was left in damages.

Following the storm, the Red Cross and World Food Council (UNDRO) set up shelters and began assisting residents in need of food and shelter. Several thousand residents were provided food, clothing and shelter across the country in mass-feeding shelters. The UNDRO also contributed $461,000 in funds to the Philippines. Another $46,000 was provided by the Government of Norway and the Catholic Relief Services donated $50,000. The Government of Japan provided $300,000 and the Government of the United States donated $25,000 in response to the overall effects of Elsie and the three preceding storms. Two other non-governmental organizations, the Lutheran World Federation and World Council of Churches allocated $10,000 and $30,000, respectively, for the Philippines.

== See also ==
- 1989 Pacific typhoon season
- Typhoon Megi (2010)
- Typhoon Nesat (2011)
- Typhoon Nalgae (2011)
- Tropical Storm Wutip (2025) - a typhoon that flooded the Hainan and affected the same areas to Elsie.
