= Typhoon Nalgae (2011) =

Pacific typhoon in 2011

Typhoon Nalgae (Quiel)
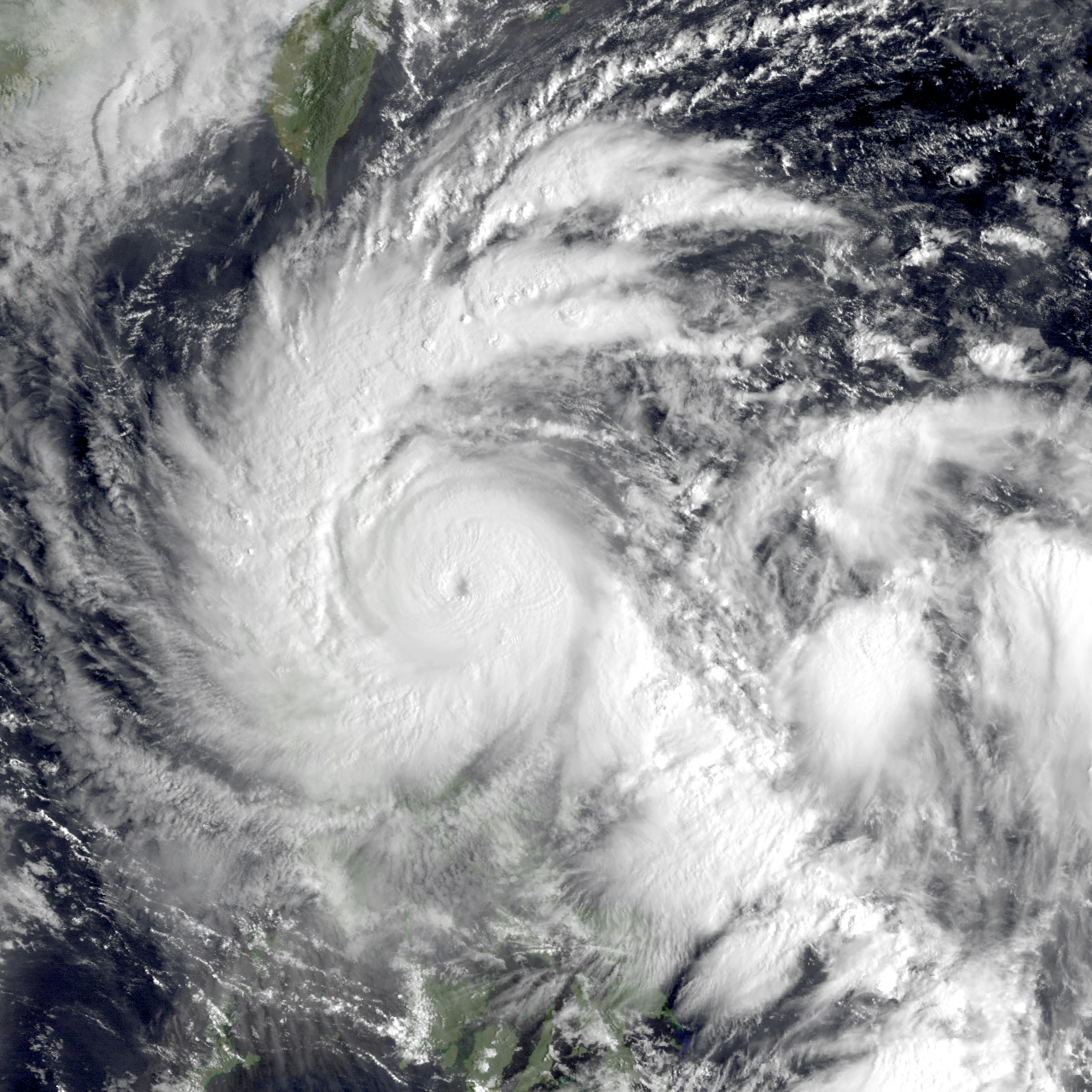
- Nalgae at peak intensity and making landfall in the Philippines late on September 30

Meteorological history
- Formed: September 26, 2011
- Dissipated: October 5, 2011

Very strong typhoon
- 10-minute sustained (JMA)
- Highest winds: 175 km/h (110 mph)
- Lowest pressure: 935 hPa (mbar); 27.61 inHg

Category 4-equivalent super typhoon
- 1-minute sustained (SSHWS/JTWC)
- Highest winds: 240 km/h (150 mph)
- Lowest pressure: 926 hPa (mbar); 27.34 inHg

Overall effects
- Fatalities: 18 total
- Damage: $250 million (2011 USD)
- Areas affected: Philippines; China; Vietnam; Thailand
- IBTrACS
- Part of the 2011 Pacific typhoon season

Typhoon Nalgae, known in the Philippines as Typhoon Quiel, was a powerful tropical cyclone that struck the Philippines, and it affected Hainan, China as a weak tropical storm. Nalgae was the eighth typhoon and the fourth super typhoon in 2011. Forming as the 32nd tropical depression of the season, the system formed on September 26 over the Philippine Sea. On September 27, it was named Nalgae as it explosively intensified into a typhoon on the next day. Nalgae reached its peak intensity as a Category 4 typhoon on September 30 while it made landfall over Luzon. Nalgae weakened into a tropical storm as it entered the South China Sea on October 1. Nalgae made landfall over the Hainan Island in China on October 4 as it weakened to a tropical depression. Nalgae dissipated on October 5 east of Vietnam.

== Meteorological history ==
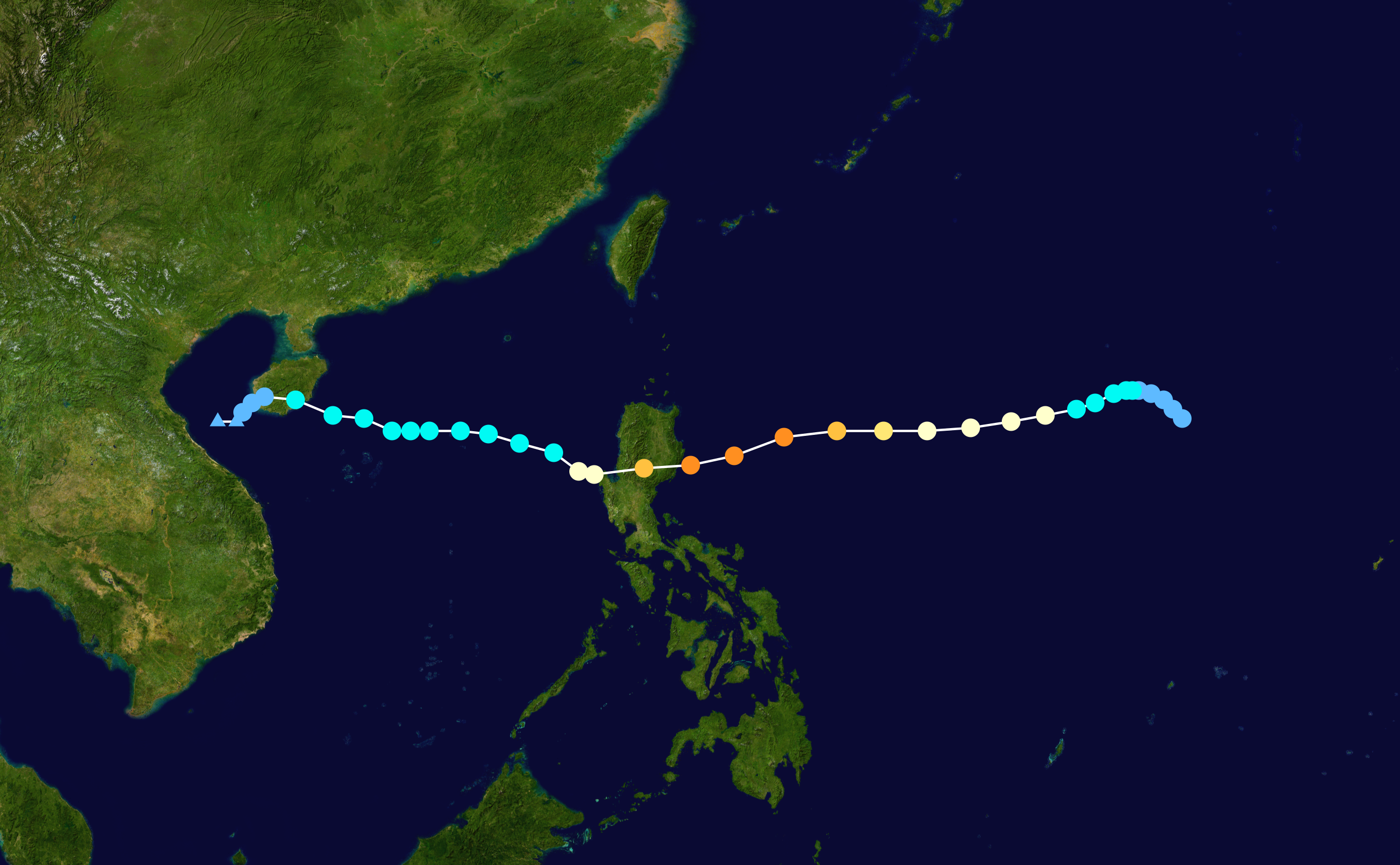
Map plotting the storm's track and intensity, according to the Saffir–Simpson scale Map key Saffir–Simpson scale Tropical depression (≤38 mph, ≤62 km/h) Tropical storm (39–73 mph, 63–118 km/h) Category 1 (74–95 mph, 119–153 km/h) Category 2 (96–110 mph, 154–177 km/h) Category 3 (111–129 mph, 178–208 km/h) Category 4 (130–156 mph, 209–251 km/h) Category 5 (≥157 mph, ≥252 km/h) Unknown Storm type Tropical cyclone Subtropical cyclone Extratropical cyclone, remnant low, tropical disturbance, or monsoon depression

On September 26, the Japan Meteorological Agency (JMA) started to monitor a weak tropical depression that had developed about 1,260 km (785 mi) to the northwest of Manila in the Philippines. During that day, while the depression moved towards the northwest its low level circulation centre rapidly consolidated in an area of favourable conditions for further development of the system. This prompted the Joint Typhoon Warning Center (JTWC) to issue a tropical cyclone formation alert on the system early the next day. However less than 3 hours later, the JTWC decided to issue advisories on the system designating it as Tropical Depression 22W, before the JMA reported that the depression had become a tropical storm and named it Nalgae. (Note: The name Nalgae (Korean: 날개, [na̠ɭɡɛ]) was contributed by North Korea and means wing in Korean.)

The storm slowly drifted to the west and kept on intensifying gradually. On September 29, microwave imagery showed Nalgae developed an eyelike feature and well defined convective banding in all the quadrants. The system had a tiny radius of winds, though it was still strengthening significantly and was very well defined. On the evening of September 28, the JMA reported that Nalgae continued to intensify, as they upgraded it to a severe tropical storm with winds of over 55 knots (102 km/h; 63 mph). On that night, the PAGASA initiated advisories on Nalgae, giving it the local name Quiel, as it entered the Philippine Area of Responsibility (PAR).

On the morning of September 29, the JTWC reported that Nalgae developed a small microwave eye like feature and multiple convective bands wrapped tightly into the center. Using the Dvorak technique, the JTWC estimated the average 1-minute sustained wind speed of Nalgae to be at 65 knots (120 km/h; 75 mph). On that evening, the JMA further upgraded Nalgae to a typhoon. Nalgae continued to drift westwards at approximately 13 knots (24 km/h; 15 mph) and continued to intensify. On the night of September 29, Nalgae's outflow to the east got more enhanced and the outflow in all other directions remained radial. Nalgae was running west quite quickly because of a strong and a deep subtropical ridge located to the east of the system. The JTWC anticipated Nalgae to continually strengthen before it made landfall over Luzon, Philippines. Continuing on its quick westward run, Nalgae developed a tiny 5 nautical miles (9.3 km; 5.8 mi) eye with a small break in the eyewall around the eastern periphery, because of a slight vertical wind shear as estimated by the JTWC. There was deep convective banding extending approximately 120 nautical miles (220 km; 140 mi) from the center and the overall outflow remained good. based on Dvorak intensity estimates, the winds of Nalgae were then raised to 95 knots (176 km/h; 109 mph).

== Preparations ==
=== Philippines ===
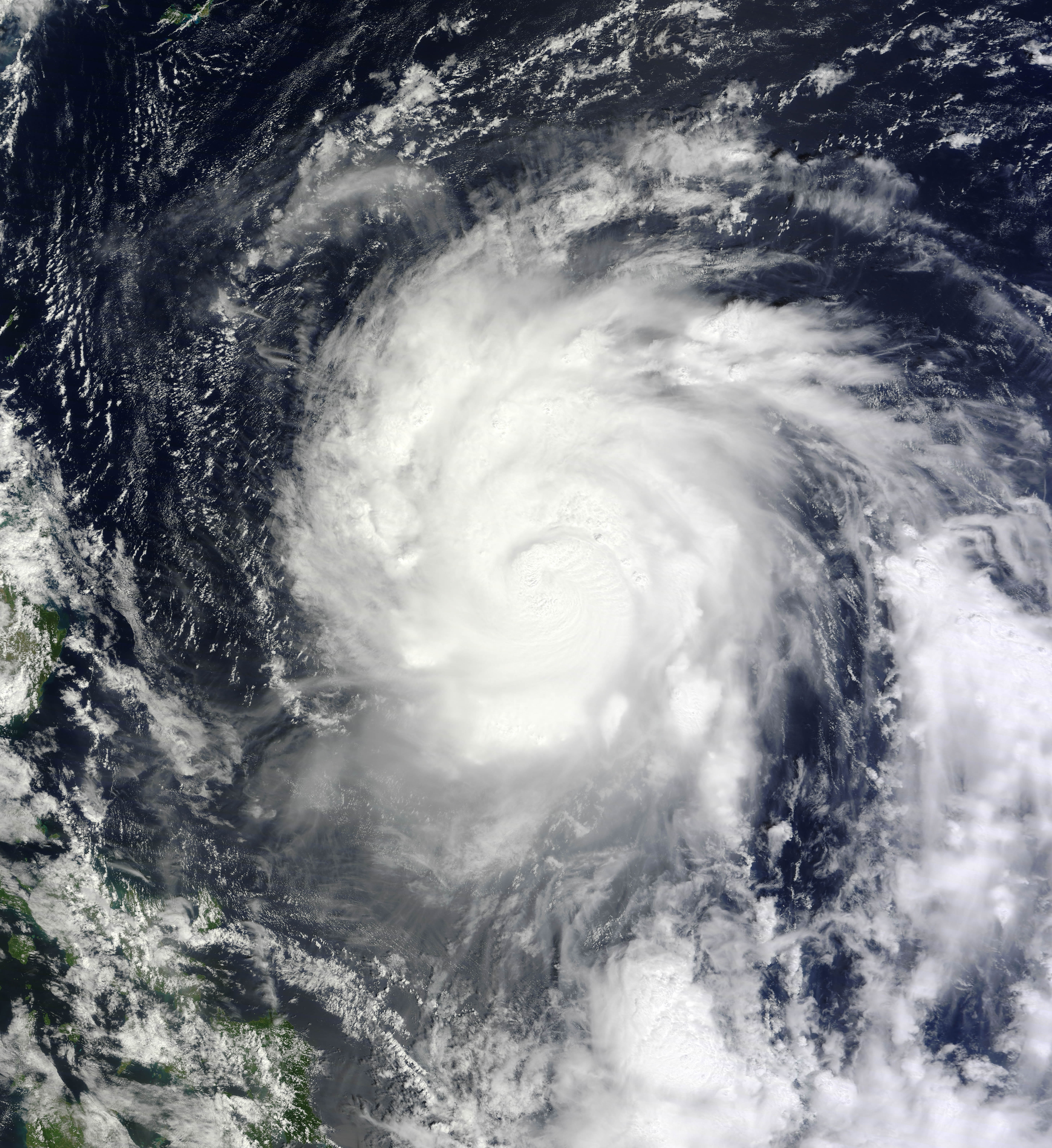
Typhoon Nalgae approaching the Philippines on September 30

On September 30, the Americans living in Philippines were reminded by the United States government "to carry their travel documents at all times and secure them in a safe and waterproof location." The government launched the helpline numbers 1-888-407-4747 and 1-202-501-4444 so that the people traveling within the country can obtain updated information from the Department of State. Also, the PAGASA insisted all people living in the low-lying areas to leave immediately. The said that "Even areas that are currently not flooded are in danger because water from flooded communities will eventually seep into neighboring areas." The PAGASA hoisted public storm warning signal number 3 in Cagayan and Isabela as the storm drifted closer. They said that "The coming storm is expected to bring strong winds, but authorities are more concerned about the amount of rainfall it will pour." Fears worsened as the typhoon came 4 days after Typhoon Nesat devastated the same place and also lead to a state of calamity being declared. Five towns in Cagayan were still flooded and the same place was to be hit by Nalgae, which is much stronger than Nesat.

=== Highest Public Storm Warning Signal ===
| PSWS# | LUZON | VISAYAS | MINDANAO |
|---|---|---|---|
| PSWS #3 | Isabela, Northern Aurora, Mt. Province, Ifugao, Nueva Vizcaya, Quirino, Benguet, Ilocos Sur, La Union, Pangasinan | NONE | NONE |
| PSWS #2 | Cagayan, Apayao, Ilocos Norte, Abra, Kalinga, rest of Aurora, Nueva Ecija, Tarlac, Pampanga, Zambales, Bulacan, Northern Quezon incl. Polillo Island | NONE | NONE |
| PSWS #1 | rest of Quezon, Camarines Norte, Rizal, Bataan, Cavite, Laguna, Batangas, Lubang Island, Babuyan Group of Islands, Calayan Group of Islands, Metro Manila | NONE | NONE |

=== China ===
On October 3, the National Marine Environmental Forecasting Center of China upgraded the rainstorm alert for Typhoon Nalgae to the orange level, the second-highest alert level in the country's four-level rainstorm alert system, reporting that a number of tidal stations off the provinces of Hainan, Guangdong and Fujian would experience tides beyond the ordinary safety levels. The agency asked all the tourists heading to typhoon-hit provinces to remain flexible with their itineraries as several air and ship may be either cancelled or indefinitely delayed when the typhoon comes ashore.

== Impact ==
=== Philippines ===
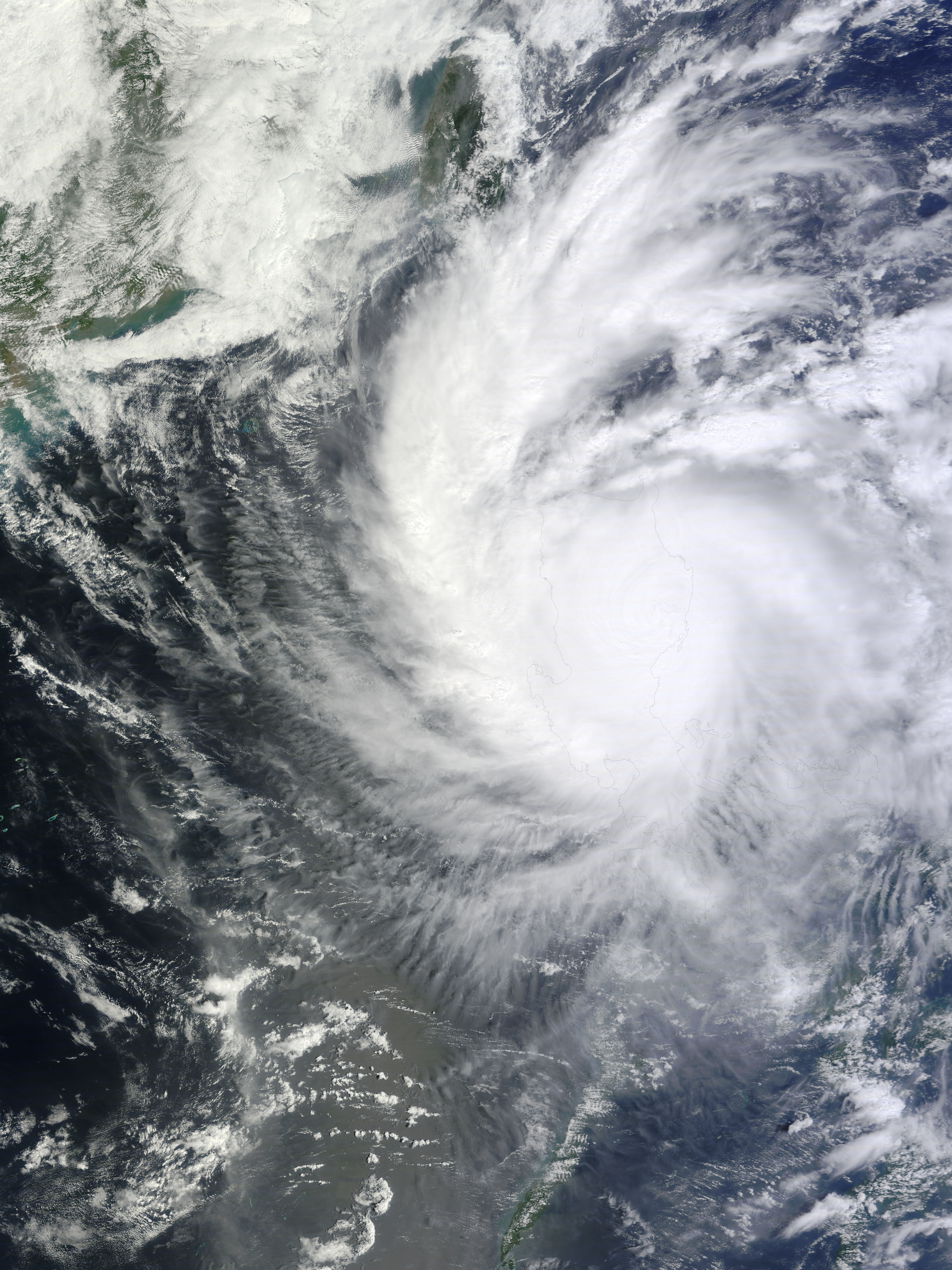
Typhoon Nalgae over the Philippines on October 1

Nalgae, the second typhoon hit Philippines within one week made landfall along the coast of Dinapigue town in Isabela province. The PAGASA weather bureau chief Graciano Yumul said that "The ground is still supersaturated and it cannot absorb more water. This will just flow down to rivers and towns, and there is a big possibility that landslides, flash flooding and flooding could occur." The search and rescue operations for Typhoon Nesat were halted because of the fierce weather brought by Nalgae. The NOLCOM chief Major General Jessie Dellosa said "Our rescue operations are ongoing with the use of watercraft and rubber boats. We are also continuously coordinating with the local government units to rescue the affected residents in Calumpit and Hagonoy." The National Disaster Risk Reduction and Management Council director Benito Ramos said that thousands of rescue workers were deployed across Luzon and the island's sparsely populated northeast coast was evacuated following the orders from the president Benigno Aquino III. Ramous said "We're implementing persuasive evacuation operations. If I have to handcuff people to remove them from their homes I could be charged with human rights violations." Nalgae was making a similar path across the saturated Luzon Island as Typhoon Nesat. The wind gusts brought by Nalgae toppled trees and blew away tin roofs of some houses in Isabela's provincial capital of Ilagan. Nalgae continued to worsen the flooding and destruction brought by Nesat. Nalgae was far more stronger than Nesat and plummeted the nation with more winds and rains. The governor of Isabela province, Faustino Dy said that "Hundreds of people in coastal areas had been evacuated as rain and strong cut power lines, uprooted trees and blocked roads with debris." He added that "Nalgae could cause floods on Luzon's central plains before passing through La Union province, a tobacco-growing area, and then heading off into the South China Sea." Also, the PAGASA announced that an estimated 10–18 mm per hour of rains were experienced in several areas across the nation filling up dams and causing river systems to swell. As the storm continued to move inland with strong winds, many structures including billboards, tarpaulins and wooden materials in the town of Cauayan were damaged. The barriers of the Isabela highway were also destroyed by the typhoon. The government responded quickly and cleared off all the debris on the highway and made it usable again. According to the National Disaster Risk Reduction and Management Council (NDDRMC), the onslaught of the typhoon resulted in the death of 1 person living in the Mountain Province, a landlocked province of the Philippines in the Cordillera Administrative Region in Luzon. It was reported that Sonny Marcos, a passenger on board a passenger van was buried alongside the Halsema Highway, the highest altitude highway in the Philippines that stretches from Baguio to Bontoc, Mountain Province. Nalgae only took about six hours to blow through the Luzon island. Office of Civil Defense administrator Benito Ramos told "We are asking everyone still refusing to leave their homes to let authorities evacuate them. The extremely strong winds blown by Nalgae set off a rockslide in northern Bontoc provincecausing boulders to roll down a mountainside and smash on a passing van, killing one man. In the rice-growing province of Bulacan north of Manila, several hundreds of people in several towns remained trapped on their rooftops as the floodwaters brought by Nesat never retreated and more flooding and rain was brought by Nalgae. Rescuers aboard rubber boats could not reach them because the alleyways were too narrow. Officials said that two army helicopters would be later deployed to rescue the victims.

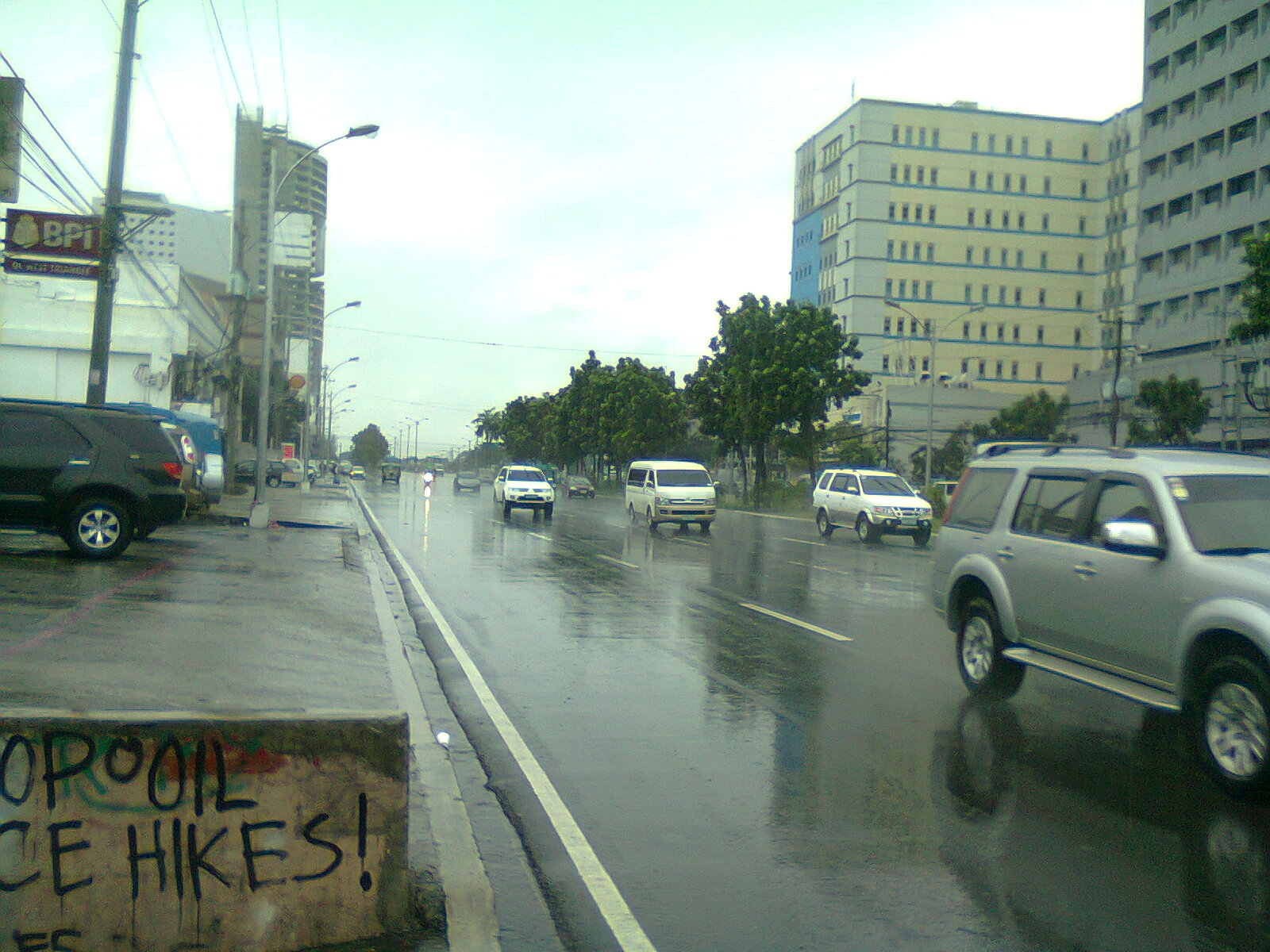
Quezon Avenue in Quezon City, during rainfall brought by Typhoon Nalgae

The province of Pampanga was badly affected - mainly due to the already prevailing floods from the previous typhoon Typhoon Nesat (Pedring). The floods continued till 5 October - much after the rains subsided. Boats were brought out to navigate the roads that had turned into rivers. The ground floor of most houses remained under water up to 4 days after Quiel passed.

==== Rescue efforts ====
The Rescue workers scrambled through the floodwaters on October 2, so that they could be able to deliver food, water and other relief materials to hundreds of villagers stuck on rooftops since several days after the twin typhoons ravaged the nation. Seven towns north of Manila including Calumpit in rice-growing Bulacan province continued to be under waist-high waters after the rains brought by Nalgae, the 17th tropical cyclone to affect the disaster-prone nation in 2011. Helicopters were able to deliver food via air, but could rescue none of those who were on the rooftops since 4 days. The main problem with the evacuations was such that most of the victims refused to leave. The residents could do nothing but wade through the floodwaters, only to find the town hall completely submerged in water. AirAsia, a Malaysian-based low-cost airline said that they would provide free aid to the victims of the twin typhoons in the Philippines. They announced that they would allocate special space in their cargo on its daily Manila bound flight. They also asked people who were interested to donate for the Filipinos could contact them at their email address, airasiacares@airasia.com.

On October 3, Philippine authorities rushed aid to thousands of people marooned in their flooded homes for a week since Nesat and Nalgae together battered the nation. After a long time, the flood water slowly started receding and the rescue workers were able to deliver food and other relief materials to those in need. In Calumpit. one of the worst hit towns, a construction worker in line for receiving the relief materials said to a new agency, "We have no food to eat, and no clean drinking water." Although floodwaters have begun to subside, thousands of families continued to stay in the evacuation centers as more than 43,000 houses were damaged by the typhoon Nesat alone. In the Pampanga province the typhoon breached several dikes or small channels developed for the flow of drain water. The destructive landslides brought by Nalgae cut off large portions of the Philippine highways isolating the town of Carranglan in Nueva Ecija. Also, after the water receded, most of the victims refused to leave their homes and head for the evacuation centers as they feared that their houses could be easily robbed in such a situation. They asked for food and relief materials to be delivered to their house instead. It was later reported that at least 8 million people living in the Philippines have experience faced much worse floods than the earlier destruction caused by typhoon Nesat. The disaster management chief Benito Ramos said "The fight is not over yet. I hope the (Nesat) floods will wash out to Manila Bay before the (Nalgae) runoff hits the area. If the latter catches up to the former, there won’t be any rooftops left to see above the floodwaters." The local weather agency announced that the water levels on the tributaries of major central Luzon rivers were still continuing to rise fast and posed a threat to the nearby towns and villages.

== See also ==
- Typhoon Chebi (2006)
- Typhoon Elsie (1989)
- Typhoon Ketsana (2009)
- Typhoon Parma (2009)
- Tropical Storm Nock-ten (2011)
- Typhoon Noru (2022) - Had a very similar trajectory and intensity before hitting the Philippines.
- Tropical Storm Wutip (2025) - Had a similar tracjectory to Nalgae.
