= List of storms named Jebi =

The name Jebi (Korean: 제비, [ˈt͡ɕe̞(ː)bi]) has been used for five tropical cyclones in the western North Pacific Ocean. The variant Chebi was used in 2001 and 2006 before the spelling was corrected by the ESCAP/WMO Typhoon Committee. The name was contributed by South Korea and means barn swallow (Hirundo rustica) in Korean.

- Typhoon Chebi (2001) (T0102, 04W, Emong) – peaked near Southwest of Taiwan and eventually made landfall in China
- Typhoon Chebi (2006) (T0620, 23W, Queenie) – a rapidly intensified typhoon which traversed the northern Philippines
- Severe Tropical Storm Jebi (2013) (T1309, 09W, Jolina) – struck the Philippines, mainland China and Vietnam
- Typhoon Jebi (2018) (T1821, 25W, Maymay) – a strong Category 5 typhoon that made landfall in west Japan.
- Typhoon Jebi (2024) (T2417, 19W) – a minimal typhoon that passed off the coast of Japan

Due to the pronunciation of Jebi being identical to that of a Croatian profane word, the UK Met Office requested the name’s retirement. It was replaced with Narae (Korean: 나래, [ˈna̠(ː)ɾɛ]), which means wing in Korean.
