= Typhoon Nesat (2011) =

Pacific typhoon in 2011

Typhoon Nesat (Pedring)
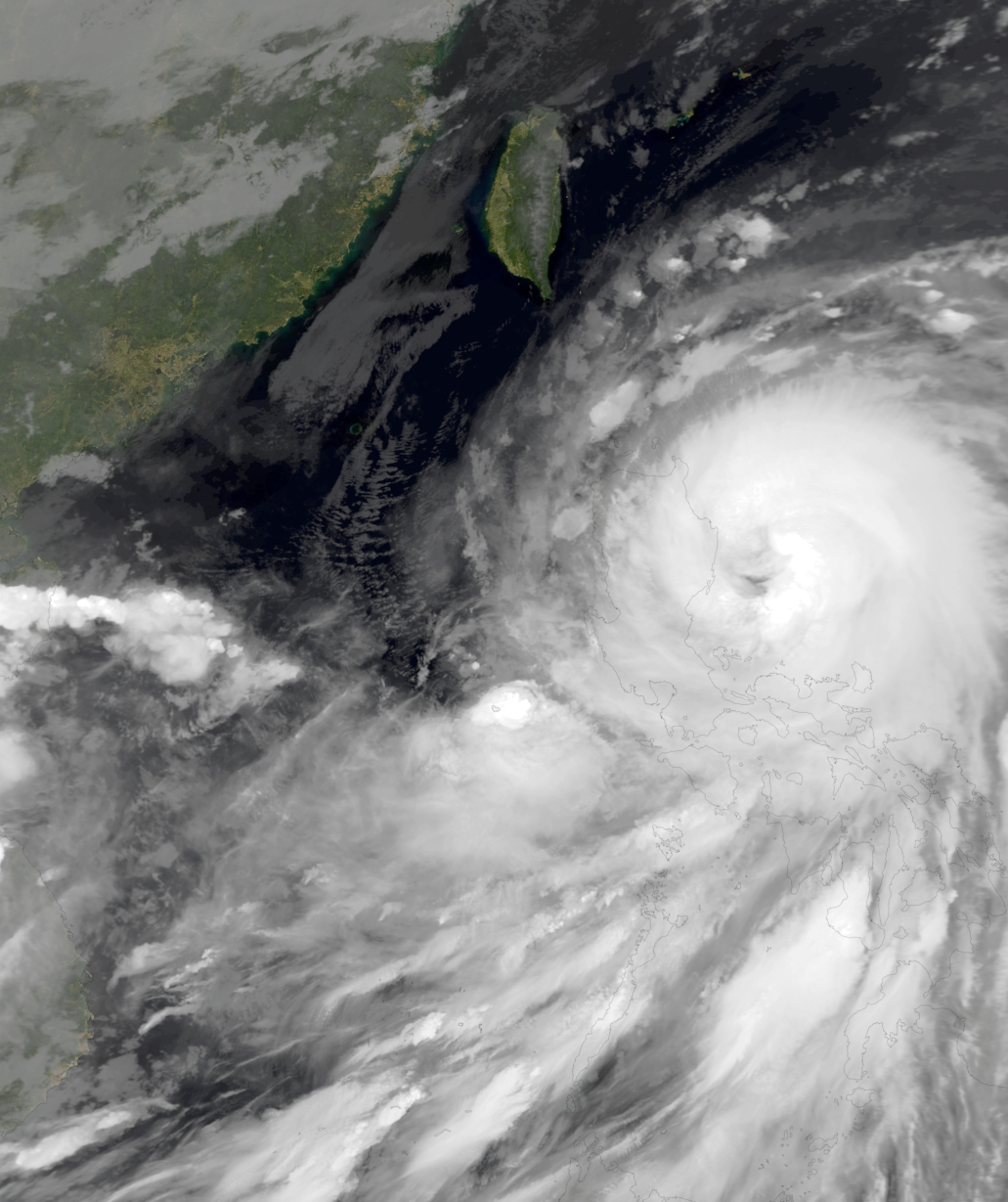
- Typhoon Nesat east of the Philippines at peak intensity on September 26

Meteorological history
- Formed: September 23, 2011
- Dissipated: September 30, 2011

Typhoon
- 10-minute sustained (JMA)
- Highest winds: 150 km/h (90 mph)
- Lowest pressure: 950 hPa (mbar); 28.05 inHg

Category 4-equivalent typhoon
- 1-minute sustained (SSHWS/JTWC)
- Highest winds: 215 km/h (130 mph)
- Lowest pressure: 937 hPa (mbar); 27.67 inHg

Overall effects
- Fatalities: 98 total
- Damage: $2.12 billion (2011 USD)
- Areas affected: Philippines, China, Malaysia, Vietnam
- IBTrACS
- Part of the 2011 Pacific typhoon season

Typhoon Nesat, known in the Philippines as Typhoon Pedring, was the most powerful tropical cyclone to directly impact China since 2008. It also struck the Philippines during late-September 2011, killing 98 people. It is the 17th named storm, the 11th severe tropical storm, the 7th typhoon and overall, the 30th tropical cyclone to be monitored by the Japan Meteorological Agency(JMA) during the year. Nesat came exactly two years after Typhoon Ketsana made landfall in the Philippines as the most devastating typhoon in the 2009 Pacific typhoon season with a damage of US$1.09 billion and 747 fatalities. Nesat was also the first of twin tropical cyclones to batter the Philippines within one week during September 2011, the second was Nalgae.

The low pressure area that was to become Nesat developed on the evening of September 21, to the east-southeast of Palau. The Joint Typhoon Warning Center (JTWC) originally anticipated Nesat would become a Category 4 super typhoon on the Saffir–Simpson Hurricane Scale (SSHS) with winds exceeding 130 kn (240 km/h; 150 mph) (1-min sustained). However, because of a cold anomaly, the system only reached a maximum 1-min sustained wind speed of 115 kn (213 km/h; 132 mph) making it a powerful Category 4 typhoon. Nesat made landfall over the Luzon region of the Philippines and the maximum 1-min sustained winds dropped to 95 kn (176 km/h; 109 mph). The system continued to weaken with convective banding loosely wrapped into the partially exposed low-level circulation center(LLCC). The winds continued to drop and eventually reached 65 kn (120 km/h; 75 mph) (1-min sustained) which made it a minimal typhoon on the SSHS. On September 29, by the time Nesat managed to re-develop a 10 nautical miles (19 kilometres; 12 miles) ragged eye, it made landfall over Wenchang in Hainan, China and started weakening again. Due to the rapid weakening, the JTWC ceased advisories on the storm, soon afterwards. Later that evening, the JMA downgraded Nesat to a tropical low over land and issued their final warning on the system.

As Nesat neared the Philippines, the local government ordered the evacuation of residents living in low-lying areas, cancelled flights and suspended classes on all levels. Several provinces were placed under Signal Number 2 and 1. China's flood control authority activated their emergency response system so that they can cope up with the upcoming typhoons Nesat, and Nalgae. The authority requested local governments in relevant areas to closely monitor both the typhoons and keep the public aware of what is happening. They initiated a level IV typhoon response program and sent two working teams to the provinces of Guangdong and Hainan so that they can assist people in all the preparations that they have to make. Ships were recalled, flight and ferry services were suspended and schools were shut as the strongest typhoon to directly impact Hainan in 2011 was approaching its final landfall. Macao's public transportation system was also suspended after typhoon signal No. 8 was hoisted by most local meteorological authorities. In Hong Kong, many functions and activities were canceled or postponed because of the fast approaching storm.

Early on September 27, Typhoon Nesat struck the Philippines with a maximum 1-min sustained wind speed of 105 kn (194 km/h; 121 mph) and killed four people after pinning them under a collapsed wall in Valenzuela. The residents of Manila had no other choice but to wade through waist-deep floodwaters, dodging branches and flying debris as the typhoon sent surging waves as tall as palm trees over seawalls, completely submerging neighborhoods. The typhoon made landfall before dawn triggering instant response. Officials in Albay province said that "About 112,000 people were ordered to leave their homes in five towns prone to flashfloods and landslides in central Albay province. Among the hardest hit provinces were Isabela and Aurora where most of the population was directly dependent on agriculture. Very similar to what happened after Typhoon Ketsana, a state of calamity was declared in Luzon in order to undertake an emergency procedure in order to ensure safe and timely water releases from the dams. Nesat approached China just one day after the preparations for it started. Because of the low strength of the storm, the damages from Nesat to China were expected to be near US$50 million. The typhoon then hit Vietnam and weakened into a tropical storm.

== Meteorological history ==
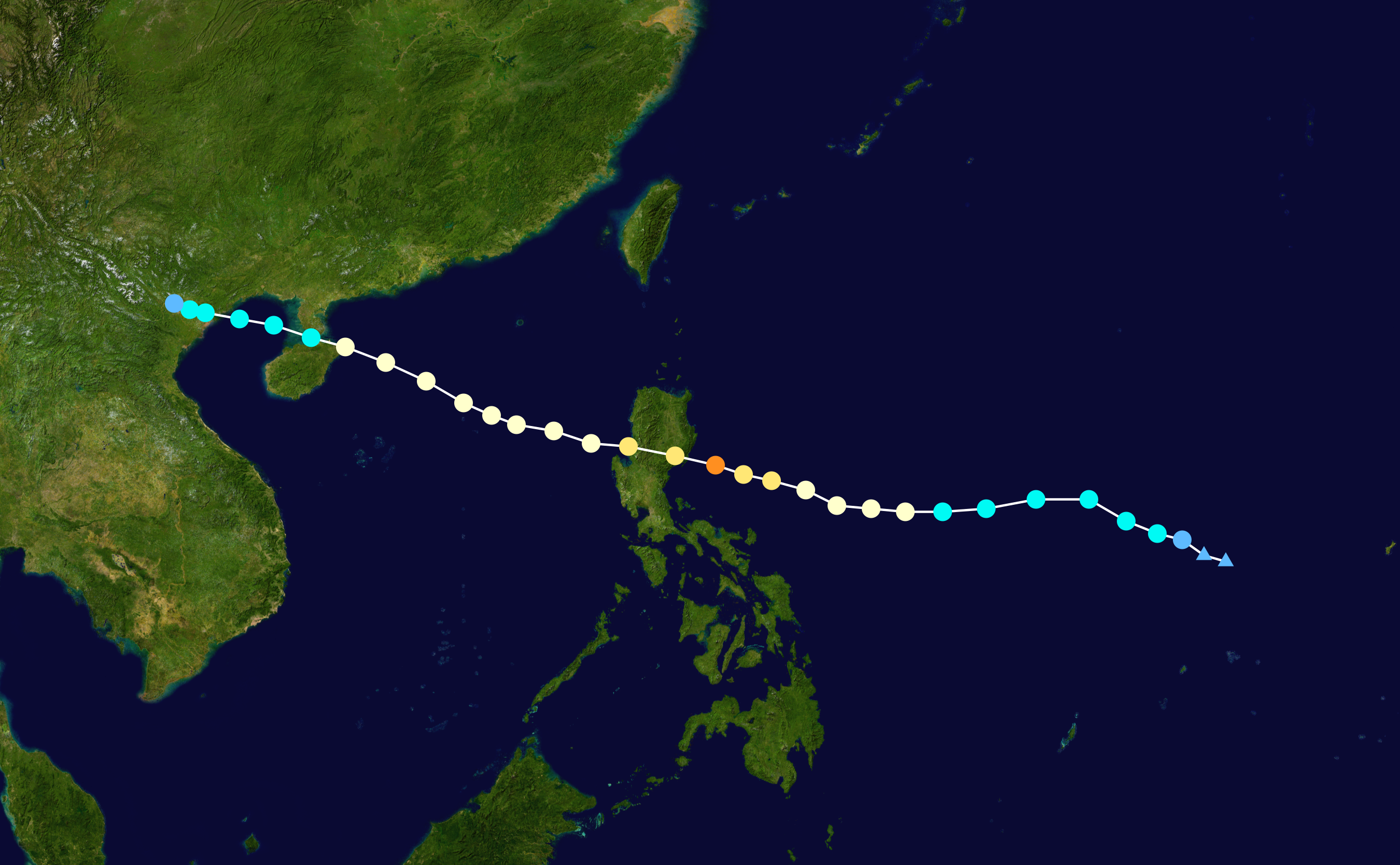
Map plotting the storm's track and intensity, according to the Saffir–Simpson scale Map key Saffir–Simpson scale Tropical depression (≤38 mph, ≤62 km/h) Tropical storm (39–73 mph, 63–118 km/h) Category 1 (74–95 mph, 119–153 km/h) Category 2 (96–110 mph, 154–177 km/h) Category 3 (111–129 mph, 178–208 km/h) Category 4 (130–156 mph, 209–251 km/h) Category 5 (≥157 mph, ≥252 km/h) Unknown Storm type Tropical cyclone Subtropical cyclone Extratropical cyclone, remnant low, tropical disturbance, or monsoon depression

During September 21, the Joint Typhoon Warning Center (JTWC) reported that a tropical disturbance had developed at the eastern end of a monsoon trough, about 360 km (225 mi) to the southeast of Melekeok on the island of Palau. The disturbance had a well defined low level circulation centre with convection flaring around it and was located in a region of moderate vertical windshear. Over the next 24 hours the depression moved towards the northeast, while gradually developing further. The Japan Meteorological Agency and the JTWC then reported during September 23 that the disturbance had developed into a tropical depression, with the latter designating it as Tropical Depression 20W.

Early on September 24, the JMA further upgraded 20W to a tropical storm and named it Nesat. (Note: The name Nesat (Khmer: នេសាទ, [neː.ˈsaːt]) was contributed by Cambodia and means fishing in Khmer.) Nesat continued to drift west with expanding deep convection around the entire system and consolidating convection around the LLCC. The mid-level warm anomaly near the system continued to intensify and convective banding near the LLCC became more and more tighter. As a result, the JMA upgraded Nesat to a severe tropical storm on September 25. Nesat was originally expected to have undergone rapid intensification until September 25, but the JTWC later reported that the sea surface temperatures was a little less than expected and Nesat could not strengthen rapidly. However, Nesat was still strengthening. With an extremely well developed equatoward outflow, Nesat already had a windspeed of 75 knots (139 km/h; 86 mph) (1-min sustained). Late on September 25, the JMA further upgraded Nesat to a typhoon.

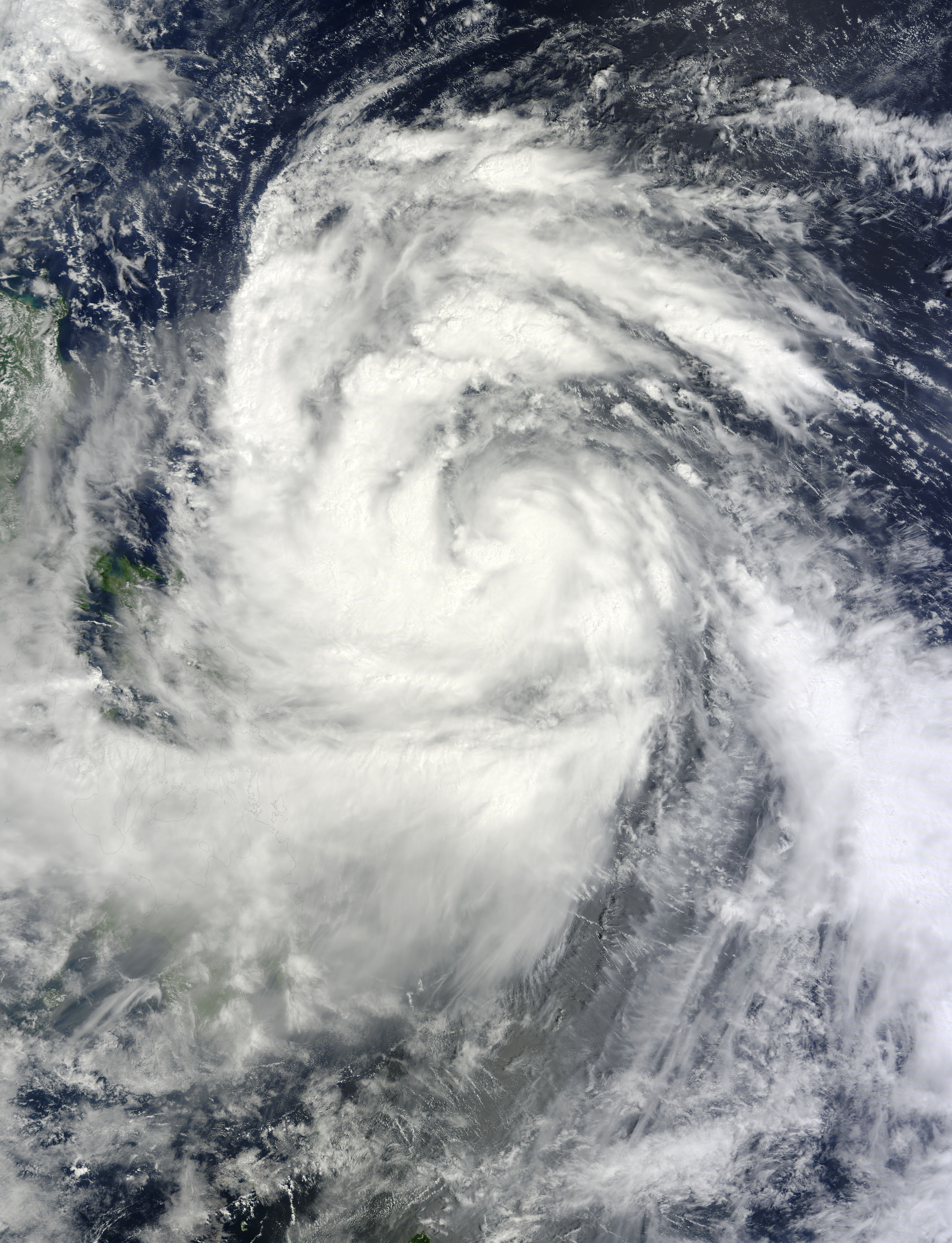
Tropical Storm Nesat intensifying off the Philippine coast on September 25

On September 26, an image from Advanced Microwave Sounding Unit (AMSU), a multi-channel microwave radiometer installed on meteorological satellites depicted that Nesat developed an eye like feature approximately 225 nautical miles (417 km; 259 mi) east-northeast of Manila, Philippines. At that time, it had a 1-min sustained wind speed of 80 knots (150 km/h; 92 mph) with deep convection primarily over the western semicircle of the system. The system rapidly deepened and quickly developed a 30 nautical miles (56 km; 35 mi) ragged eye and mesoscale anticyclone aloft generating an exceptionally excellent all-around outflow. Also, the system had a highly symmetric radial outflow. The JTWC originally anticipated Nesat to become a Category 5 super typhoon on the SSHS with winds exceeding 130 knots (240 km/h; 150 mph) (1-min sustained). However, because of a cold anomaly, the system only reached a maximum 1-min sustained wind speed of 115 knots (213 km/h; 132 mph), making it a minimum Category 4 typhoon.

Early on September 27, Nesat made landfall over the Luzon region of Philippines. As a result, the eyewall got eroded and the maximum 1-min sustained winds dropped to 95 knots (176 km/h; 109 mph). The system approached land at nearly 10 knots (19 km/h; 12 mph). However, later on that day, the LLCC started to get re-consolidated with convection as Nesat quickly moved west and re-emerged over water. At that time, it was located near the southern periphery of a deep layered subtropical steering ridge and moved towards the southwest and the winds further dropped to 85 knots (157 km/h; 98 mph) because of land interaction. Though the system has maintained overall central deep convection, subsidence persisted along the northwest quadrant which caused further drop in wind speed. Upper level analysis indicated that Nesat was to the south of a ridge axis in an area of moderate vertical wind shear. The system continued to weaken with convective banding loosely wrapped into the partially exposed LLCC. The winds continued to drop and eventually reached 65 knots (120 km/h; 75 mph) (1-min sustained) which made it a minimal typhoon on the SSHS. Though the weakening, Water vapour imagery showed that the typhoon was still maintaining excellent outflow towards the equator and improving outflow towards the pole. Nesat maintained a relatively large area of gale-force winds. Animated infrared satellite imagery depicted that the storm was expanding in size and convective banding continued to move further and further away from the LLCC. The LLCC was also relatively large, elongated and cloud free.

On September 29, by the time Nesat managed to re-develop a 10 nautical miles (19 km; 12 mi) ragged eye, it made landfall over Wenchang in Hainan, China and started weakening again. Because of the poor shape and disorganization at the LLCC, the typhoon could only maintain a maximum 1-min sustained windspeed of 65 knots (120 km/h; 75 mph). Even after the landfall, Nesat maintained vigorous convection all around the LLCC and did not weaken too much when compared to the reactions after the Philippine landfall. There was a sea-surface temperature of approximately 28 °C (82 °F) and a slight vertical wind shear of 10 knots (19 km/h; 12 mph) near the system's center at that time. The JTWC anticipated the storm to gradually drift over the Gulf of Tonkin and make landfall over Vietnam with a 1-min sustained wind speed of at least 50 knots (93 km/h; 58 mph). Early on September 30, Nesat made its final landfall over northern Vietnam with a 1-min sustained windspeed of 55 knots (102 km/h; 63 mph) and a well-defined, tightly wrapped LLCC, and soon it started weakening. Due to land interaction, the convection around the system started decaying rapidly. Due to the rapid weakening, the JTWC ceased advisories on the storm, soon afterwards. Later that evening, the JMA downgraded Nesat to a tropical low over land and issued their final warning on the system.

== Preparations and impact ==
Impact by country or region
Country	Deaths	Missing	Damage (USD)	Sources
Philippines	85	18	$333 million	
Vietnam	8		$50 million	
China	5	2	$1.74 billion	
Totals	98	20	$2.12 billion	

=== Highest Public Storm Warning Signal ===
PSWS#	Luzon	Visayas	Mindanao
3	Ilocos Norte, Ilocos Sur, Abra, Kalinga, Apayao, Mt. Province, Cagayan, Isabela, Ifugao, Benguet, La Union, Nueva Vizcaya, Quirino, Northern portion of Quezon including Polillo Island, Aurora, Pangasinan, Nueva Ecija, Tarlac, Zambales, Camarines Norte, Camarines Sur, Catanduanes	None	None
2	Bulacan, Pampanga, Bataan, Batangas, Cavite, Laguna, Rizal, Lubang Island, Batanes, Babuyan Islands, Calayan Islands, Rest of Quezon, Metro Manila	None	None
1	Oriental Mindoro, Occidental Mindoro, Marinduque, Romblon, Burias Island, Masbate including Ticao Island, Albay, Sorsogon	Northern Samar	None

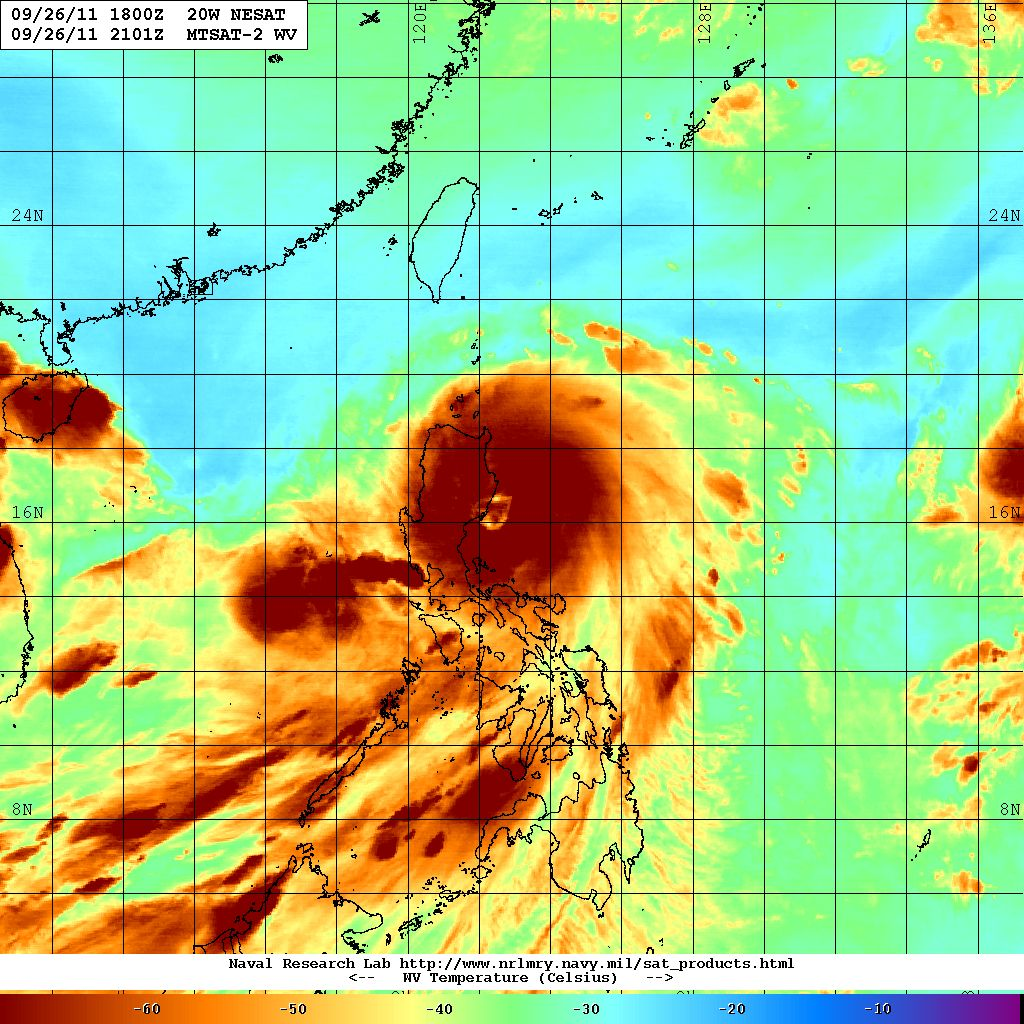
Water vapor imagery of Typhoon Nesat making landfall in the Philippines at peak intensity late on September 26

As Nesat neared the Philippines, the Philippine government ordered the evacuation of residents living in low-lying areas, cancelled flights and suspended classes on all levels. By the morning of September 26, some 111,000 people in the flood-prone areas of the Albay Province were ordered to leave their homes. Nearly 63 flights were either delayed or cancelled due to the storm. The provinces of Albay, Catanduanes and the Camarines were placed under storm warning Signal Number 2 while the provinces of Metro Manila, Masbate, Marinduque, Batangas, Cavite, Bulacan, Pampanga and most of the Northern Luzon provinces were placed under storm warning Signal Number 1. Even though Manila was placed in Storm Signal 2 (which suspends Pre-school, Elementary, and High school levels only), many universities, like the University of the Philippines Diliman & Manila and Polytechnic University of the Philippines, Main Campus, suspended classes.

Early on September 27, Typhoon Nesat struck the Philippines with a maximum 1-min sustained wind speed of 105 knots (194 km/h; 121 mph) and killed four people after pinning them under a collapsed wall in Valenzuela. The typhoon pounded the Luzon region of the Philippines triggering flash floods, cutting power and halting daily activity in the capital Manila. The Philippine Stock Exchange and US embassy were forced to close due to the strong winds and heavy rains. The residents of Manila had no other choice but to wade through waist-deep floodwaters, dodging branches and flying debris as the typhoon sent surging waves as tall as palm trees over seawalls completely submerging neighborhoods. By the evening of September 27, at least 7 people were reported to be killed and most of them in metropolitan Manila, a place already battered by heavy monsoonal rains. A motorcyclist in the city reported that "It's flooded everywhere. We don’t have a place to go for shelter. Even my motorcycle got filled with water". He was one of the thousands stranded by fast-rising flood in the city. Similar to Tulane University during Hurricane Katrina, the Ospital ng Maynila Medical Center moved patients from its ground floor which was flooded with neck-deep waters. Hospital generators were flooded and the building had no power once the typhoon arrived. Soldiers and police in trucks moved thousands of residents, most importantly the women and the children away from the Baseco shanty town after many houses were washed away in the storm surge and floodwaters brought by Nesat. The typhoon made landfall before dawn triggering instant response.

Nearly thirty-seven percent of Manila Electric Company's service area was left without power after high winds and heavy rains toppled power lines. A company spokeswoman reported that "About 1.9 million customers of the nation's biggest power retailer are still without electricity. That's about 39 percent of its 4.9 million customers, compared with 44 percent who were without power at midday." Also, in Malabon, Navotas and Valenzuela the Manila Electric power company shut down power to prevent any accidents. Dina Lomotan, the company spokesman said that "Manila Electric will try to restore power as conditions permit, prioritizing areas not directly affected by the storm." President Benigno Aquino III said "I have been in touch with Secretaries Soliman, Gazmin, and Almendras. I have instructed the Executive Secretary to compile information from National Disaster Risk Reduction and Management Council and to inform our people of conditions, as well as of government efforts to mitigate the effects of the storm." He also said "I am in constant touch with the members of my cabinet, and the Executive Secretary has been instructed to keep me and the public informed of conditions pertaining as well as mitigation efforts". On September 28, the death toll from Nesat was put at 18 and the number of missing at 35 after the day-long rain and winds. The National Disaster Risk Reduction and Management Council chief Benito Ramos said, "We are focusing on trying to get power and telecommunications services today, and work crews have also fanned out to repair and clear 61 road networks across Luzon damaged by landslides, debris and floods". The extremely high storm surges brought by Nesat crashed over seawalls, flooding a hospital, a five-star hotel, and the US embassy near Manila. As more power lines were downed, nearly a million people in Luzon and some areas in the capital Manila remained without power for the rest of September 27 and 28.

Among the hardest hit provinces were Isabela and Aurora where most of the population was directly dependent on Agriculture. Out of the total known deaths, most of them were reported to have occurred in and around metropolitan Manila. Santiago Austria, the mayor of Jaén, a 1st class municipality in the province of Nueva Ecija said "We only have four boats but there are so many people waiting to be rescued. Many people here are still on top of their houses. We don't have enough boats to reach them and hand them food." The strong winds that blew through Manila toppled about 40 huge trees around the coastline from where thousands of people were moved from shantytowns into three different school buildings. The number of passengers stranded after Nesat's approach was as high as 4,476 in various ports 28 vessels and 20 motorized bancas were stopped at several ports in Luzon. A spokesman from the Philippine Coast Guard said that the bulk of stranded persons were stuck in ports in Manila, with 3,672; Lucena, 280; and Batangas, 140. By the night of September 28, Nesat's death toll eventually rose to 31. At that time, the first figures of the total estimated damage to agriculture and infrastructure started coming up and was put at 1 billion pesos (22.8 million U.S. dollars). The Philippine Department of Health, which is the executive department of the Philippine Government responsible for ensuring access to basic public health services to all Filipinos prepared medical supplies including 2.9 million pesos (66,360 U.S. dollars) worth of food and emergency supplies so that they can be distributed among the victims when the flood water recedes.

==== State of calamity ====
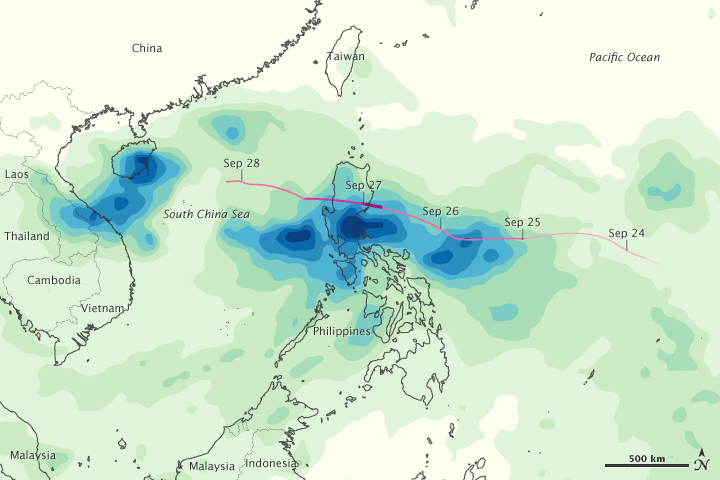
Rain from Typhoon Nesat

The Department of Social Welfare and Development (DSWD) and Philippine National Police (PNP) instantly responded to the state of emergency. The DSWD provided a total of 1.5-million Philippine Peso worth of relief goods and the PNP dispatched personnel and medical teams in order to assist the victims. The National Electrification Administration administrator Edita Bueno said that "More than 900,000 out of 1.2 million consumers were still cut off from the grid, but repairs are ongoing and electric cooperatives would have to wait for the grid's complete restoration before they could bring back electricity."

==== NDRRMC Situation reports ====
Early on September 29, the National Disaster Risk Reduction and Management Council (NDRRMC) issued a Situation report on the typhoon mentioning that at least 35 people were killed while 34 were injured and 45 still remained missing. They also added that the total amount of damage to agriculture and infrastructure was put at US$26,208,476. They mentioned that a total of 83 emergency incidents were monitored in various regions that were directly hit by the typhoon. In the hardest hit provinces, at least 25 folding beds; 18 tents; 40 boxes of blankets; 125 pieces of plastic mat; 200 pieces of water jugs; 125 pieces of mosquito nets; 5 pieces of protective suits; 5 pairs of goggles; 5 pieces of oil resistant boots, 5 pieces of rain coats; 10 pieces of gloves; 5 pieces of helmets; and 10 pieces of T-shirts were provided to the victims. Following the daily pattern of Situation reports, the NDRRMC issued another report on September 30, pushing up the number of dead to 43, the number of injured to 44 while pulling down the number of missing to 30. They reported that the total number of people affected were 986,417 in about 205,885 families. They also announced that there was a drastic increase in the total amount of damage from Nesat to both agriculture and infrastructure. They said that the total damage was at US$91,356,378 out of which US$78,893,835 was to agriculture alone. According to the report, the storm completely destroyed a total of 3,394 houses while 12,901 were badly damaged.

Again on October 1, the NDRRMC reported the number of dead was as high as 50, the number of injured was 61 and the number of missing was 31. They further increased the total damage from Nesat to both agriculture and infrastructure to around US$136,957,559 where nearly US$123,951,792 was to agriculture alone. They said that a total of 60 bridge/road sections were reported impassable during the storm. The reports also indicated that all the transmission lines affected by the typhoon were put back to normal and power was restored completely. The NDRRMC further added that the Philippine National Police deployed a total of 87 deployed personnel in Hermosa, Bataan, Tarlac, Bulacan, and Pampanga; a total of 579 personnel deployed to help in the evacuation and rescue operations in the provinces of Aurora, Pampanga, Bulacan, Tarlac, and Angeles City. On October 2, the NDRRMC finalized the death toll to 52, the number of injured to 63 and the number of missing to 30. Also, they announced that the total damage to agriculture and infrastructure was amounted to US$153,316,943; making it one of the most destructive tropical cyclones ever to hit the archipelago.

However, again on October 3, the NDRRMC confirmed more deaths, putting the number of dead at 85; the number of injured at 65 and the number of missing at 2. Also, they announced that Nesat was one of the costliest typhoons to have affected the nation by putting the total damage from Nesat to both agriculture and infrastructure at US$333 million.

=== China, Malaysia and Vietnam ===
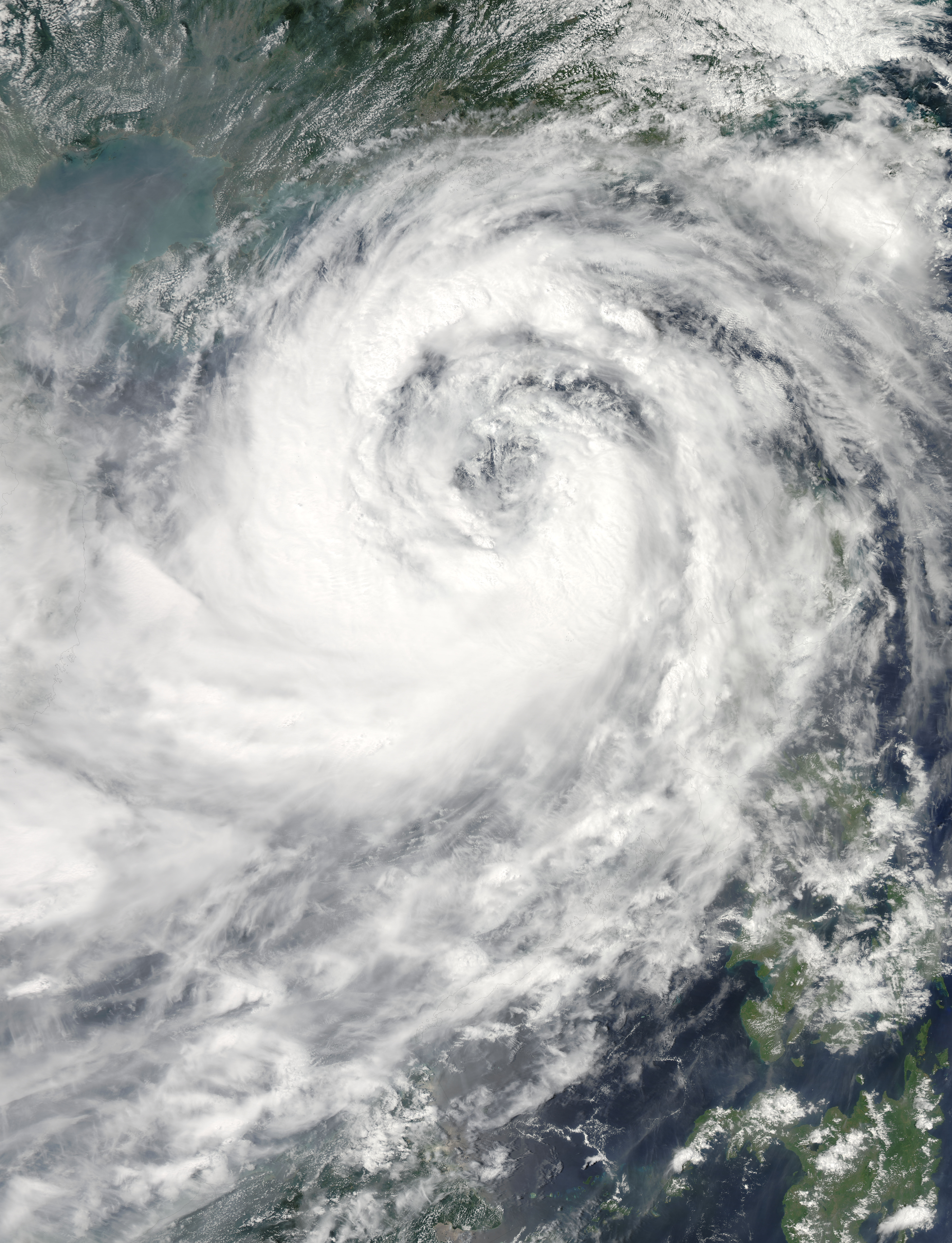
Typhoon Nesat organizing in the South China Sea on September 28

On September 28, China's flood control authority activated their emergency response system so that they can cope up with the upcoming typhoons Nesat, and Nalgae. The authority requested local governments in relevant areas to closely monitor both the typhoons and keep the public aware of what is happening. They initiated a level IV typhoon response program and sent two working teams to the provinces of Guangdong and Hainan so that they can assist people in all the preparations that they have to make. The passenger ferry services linking the southern island province of Hainan and the rest of the nation were halted as typhoon Nesat neared land. Nesat was expected to be the strongest to hit Hainan in six years. The Hainan provincial meteorological bureau's director, Cai Qinbo, advised all people living in coastal areas to evacuate and also to brace for flash floods and other storm related natural disasters that Nesat may bring to the nation. Ships were recalled, flight and ferry services were suspended and schools were shut as the strongest typhoon to directly impact Hainan in 2011 was approaching its final landfall. In order to ensure the safety of the children, most kindergartens, primary and middle schools in Haikou, the capital of Hainan suspended classes very early. The Meilan Airport in Haikou city canceled a total of 49 flights. In all, 5 people were killed in South China. Total economic losses in South China were amounted to be CNY 11.10971 billion (US$1.736 billion), including 2.86 billion CNY in Guangdong Province, 2.436 billion CNY in Guangxi, 5.81371 billion CNY from Hainan Province.

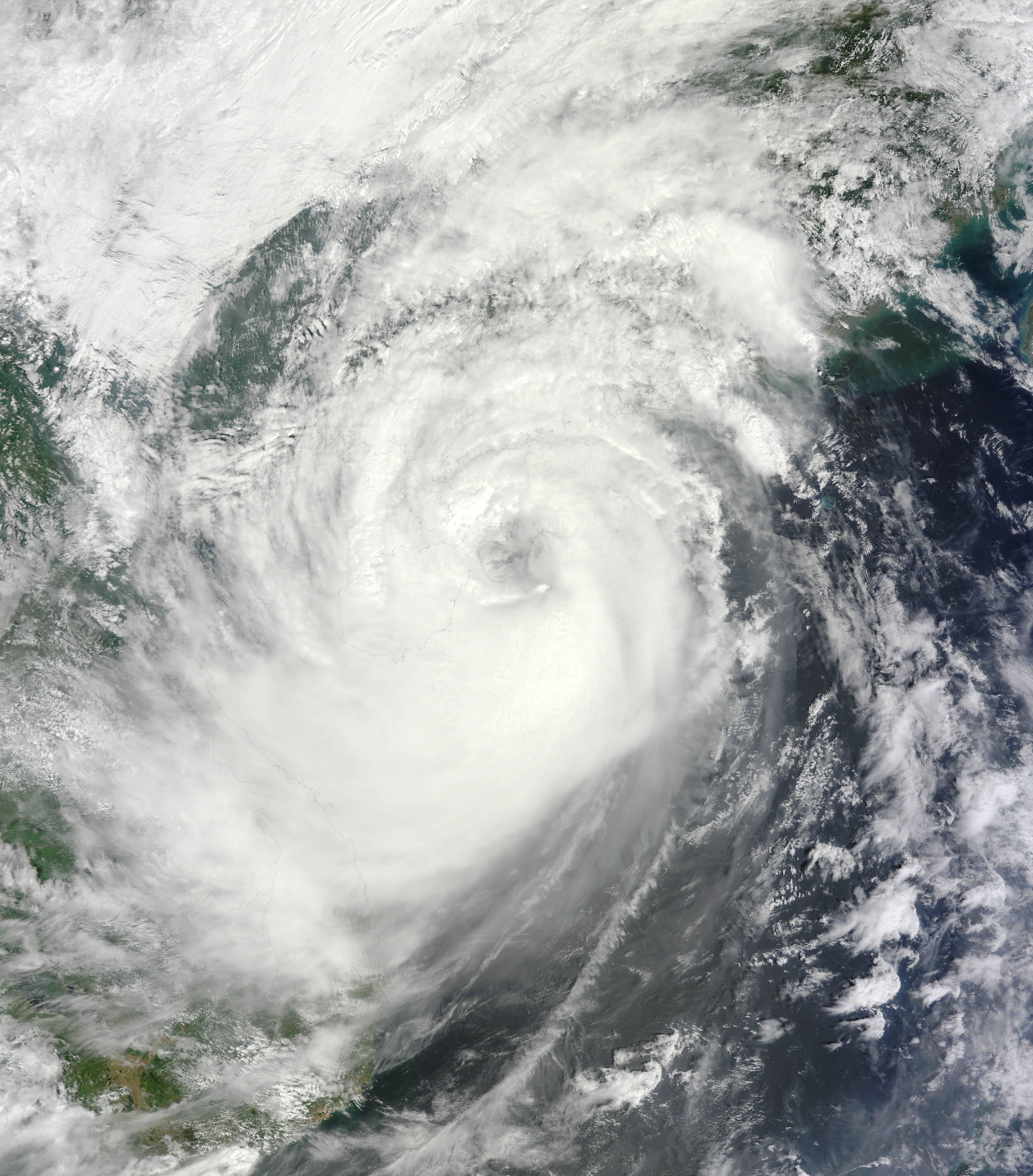
Typhoon Nesat near landfall in Hainan, China on September 29

Nesat approached China just one day after the preparations for it started. On September 29, the Hong Kong Stock Exchange was shut down after the Hong Kong Observatory hoisted a number eight storm signal. The government offices and courts were also closed, delaying the widely anticipated ruling in Vallejos v. Commissioner of Registration. The strong winds injured at least three people after Nesat slammed into the southern Chinese island of Hainan forcing more than 100,000 people to leave their homes. Nesat was one of the strongest storms to strike the nation after the highest storm warning in two years was issued in Hong Kong as Typhoon Nesat swept past the city. All flights and high-speed railway services to the resort city of Sanya in Hainan were canceled or indefinitely delayed as the typhoon approached. Powerful tail winds from Nesat affected areas in the west coast of Sabah on the northern part of Borneo. The winds caused power lines being knocked down causing power outages affecting 15,000 consumers. The winds also caused trees being uprooted, and roofs and billboards destroyed. State Meteorological Department recorded winds up to 95 km/h. The typhoon then hit Vietnam and weakened into a tropical storm. The disaster officials in Vietnam said that "The fish and shrimp farmers had been moved to safe areas along the northern and central coasts. Some 4,000 people, mostly the elderly, women and children, were also evacuated in three coastal districts in Nam Định province." Because of the low strength of the storm, the damages from Nesat to china were expected to be near US$50 million. AIR Worldwide said that "Insurance penetration for typhoons is quite low in China, particularly for residential risks, and insurance penetration varies by province, Hainan having one of the lowest rates in China." However, on October 4, the state run Xinhua News Agency confirmed that the damage exceeded 900 million United States dollars or 5.8 billion yuan as Nesat was one of the strongest typhoons to hit Hainan, affecting at least 3.77 million people.

=== Hong Kong and Macau ===
In Hong Kong, many functions and activities were canceled or postponed because of the fast approaching storm. The Hong Kong's stock market, all courts, tribunals, court registries and offices were completely shut for the rest of September 29. Also, the education bureau announced suspension of all classes and the Hospital Authority suspended general out-patient and specialist clinics for the entire day too. In order to help people in need of refuge during the landfall, the city's Home Affairs Department opened 11 temporary shelters in various districts across Hong Kong. Macao's public transportation system was also suspended after typhoon signal No. 8 was hoisted by most local meteorological authorities. Macao's Meteorological and Geophysical Bureau issued signal 8 while the storm was estimated to be about 350 km south of Macao at 4:00 a.m. local time. The local traffic authorities reacted in a timely manner and closed all the three sea-crossing bridges of the island city. Late on September 27, the Hong Kong Observatory and the Macau Weather bureau hoisted the standby signal no.1, so that residents of the regions, could start to make preparations for the incoming typhoon. Both weather offices then issued Strong Wind Signal No. 3 later that day, before hoisting issuing the No. 8 Gale or Storm Signal on September 29 as Nesat started to affect the regions with easterly gale-force windspeeds. All signals were then lowered during September 30. Within Hong Kong, 418 reports of fallen trees and 15 reports of collapsed scaffolding were received by the Hong Kong Observatory, with a total of 25 people injured while at the Hong Kong airport over 40 flights were cancelled due to the adverse weather associated with Nesat.

== Aftermath ==
=== Typhoon Nalgae ===
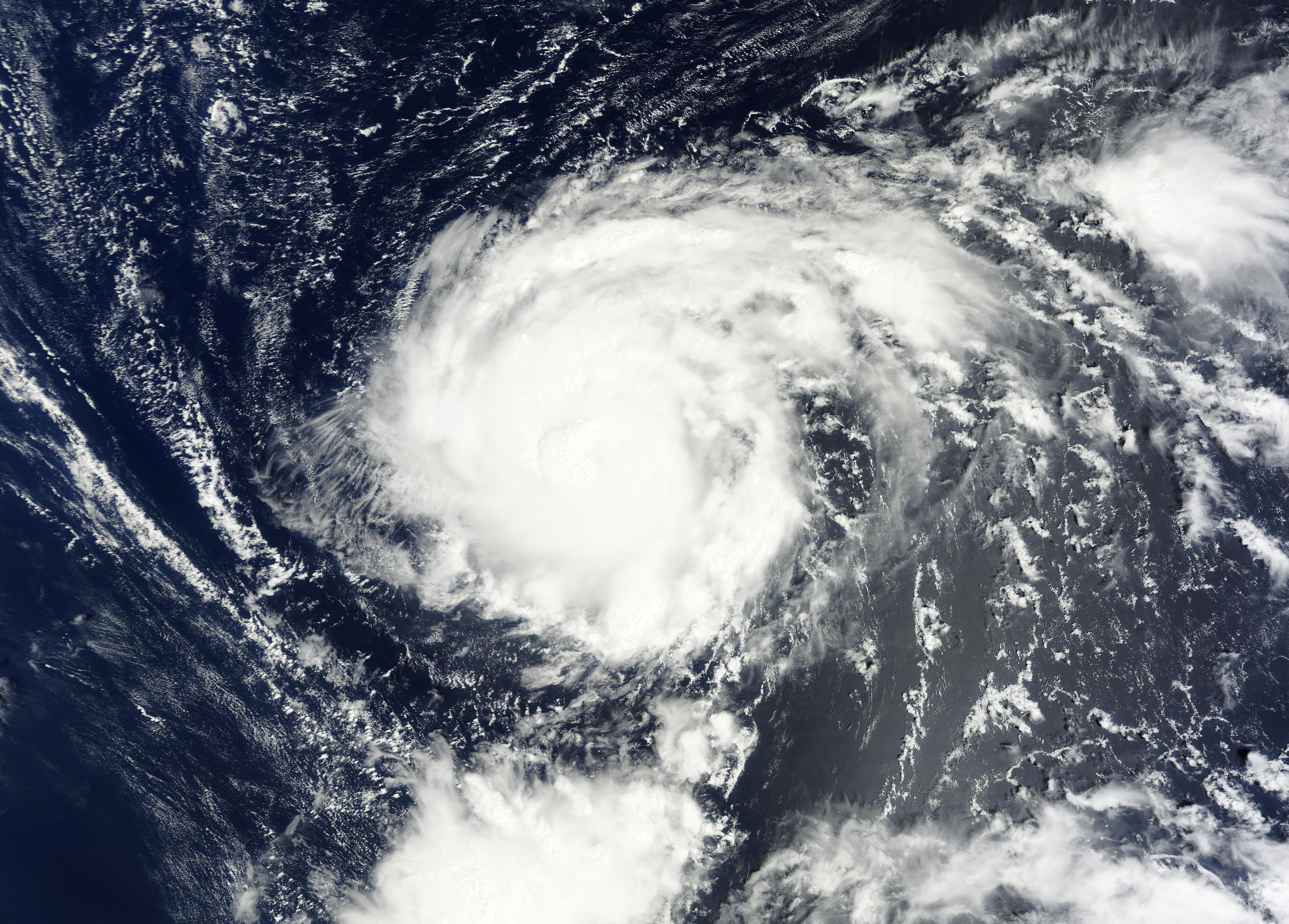
Tropical Storm Nalgae intensifying off the Philippine coast on September 29

On September 30, the Americans living in Philippines were reminded by the United States government "to carry their travel documents at all times and secure them in a safe and waterproof location." The government launched the helpline numbers 1-888-407-4747 and 1-202-501-4444 so that the people traveling within the country can obtain updated information from the Department of State. Also, the PAGASA insisted all people living in the low-lying areas to leave immediately. The said that "Even areas that are currently not flooded are in danger because water from flooded communities will eventually seep into neighboring areas." The PAGASA hoisted public storm warning signal number 3 in Cagayan and Isabela provinces as the storm drifted closer. They said that "The coming storm is expected to bring strong winds, but authorities are more concerned about the amount of rainfall it will pour." Fears worsened as the typhoon came in less than 5 days after Nesat devastated the same place and also lead to a state of calamity being declared. Five towns in Cagayan were still flooded and the same place was to be hit by Nalgae, which is much more stronger than Nesat.

The extremely strong winds blown by Nalgae set off a rockslide in northern Bontoc provincecausing boulders to roll down a mountainside and smash on a passing van, killing one man. In the rice-growing province of Bulacan north of Manila, several hundreds of people in several towns remained trapped on their rooftops as the floodwaters brought by Nesat never retreated and more flooding and rain was brought by Nalgae. Rescuers aboard rubber boats could not reach them because the alleyways were too narrow. Officials said that two army helicopters would be later deployed to rescue the victims.

The Rescue workers scrambled through the floodwaters on October 2, so that they could be able to deliver food, water and other relief materials to hundreds of villagers stuck on rooftops since several days after the twin typhoons ravaged the nation. Seven towns north of Manila including Calumpit in rice-growing Bulacan province continued to be under waist-high waters after the rains brought by Nalgae, the 17th tropical cyclone to affect the disaster-prone nation in 2011. Helicopters were able to deliver food via air, but could rescue none of those who were on the rooftops since 4 days. On October 3, Philippine authorities rushed aid to thousands of people marooned in their flooded homes for a week since Nesat and Nalgae together battered the nation. After a long time, the flood water slowly started receding and the rescue workers were able to deliver food and other relief materials to those in need. In Calumpit. one of the worst hit towns, a construction worker in line for receiving the relief materials said to a new agency, "We have no food to eat, and no clean drinking water." It was later reported that at least 8 million people living in the Philippines have experience faced much worse floods than the earlier destruction caused by typhoon Nesat. The disaster management chief Benito Ramos said "The fight is not over yet. I hope the (Nesat) floods will wash out to Manila Bay before the (Nalgae) runoff hits the area. If the latter catches up to the former, there won’t be any rooftops left to see above the floodwaters." The local weather agency announced that the water levels on the tributaries of major central Luzon rivers were still continuing to rise fast and posed a threat to the nearby towns and villages.

=== Retirement ===
Due to extremely high amount of damage that the storm has caused in the Philippines, the PAGASA announced that the name Pedring would be stricken off their tropical cyclone naming lists despite its first usage. In June 2012 the name Perla was chosen by PAGASA for the 2015 season. However, due to the limited number of typhoons that entered Philippine area of Responsibility on that year, the name wasn't used, and instead was first used in the 2019 season.

== See also ==
- Tropical cyclones in 2011
- List of Philippine typhoons (2000–present)
