= 2007 North Indian Ocean cyclone season =

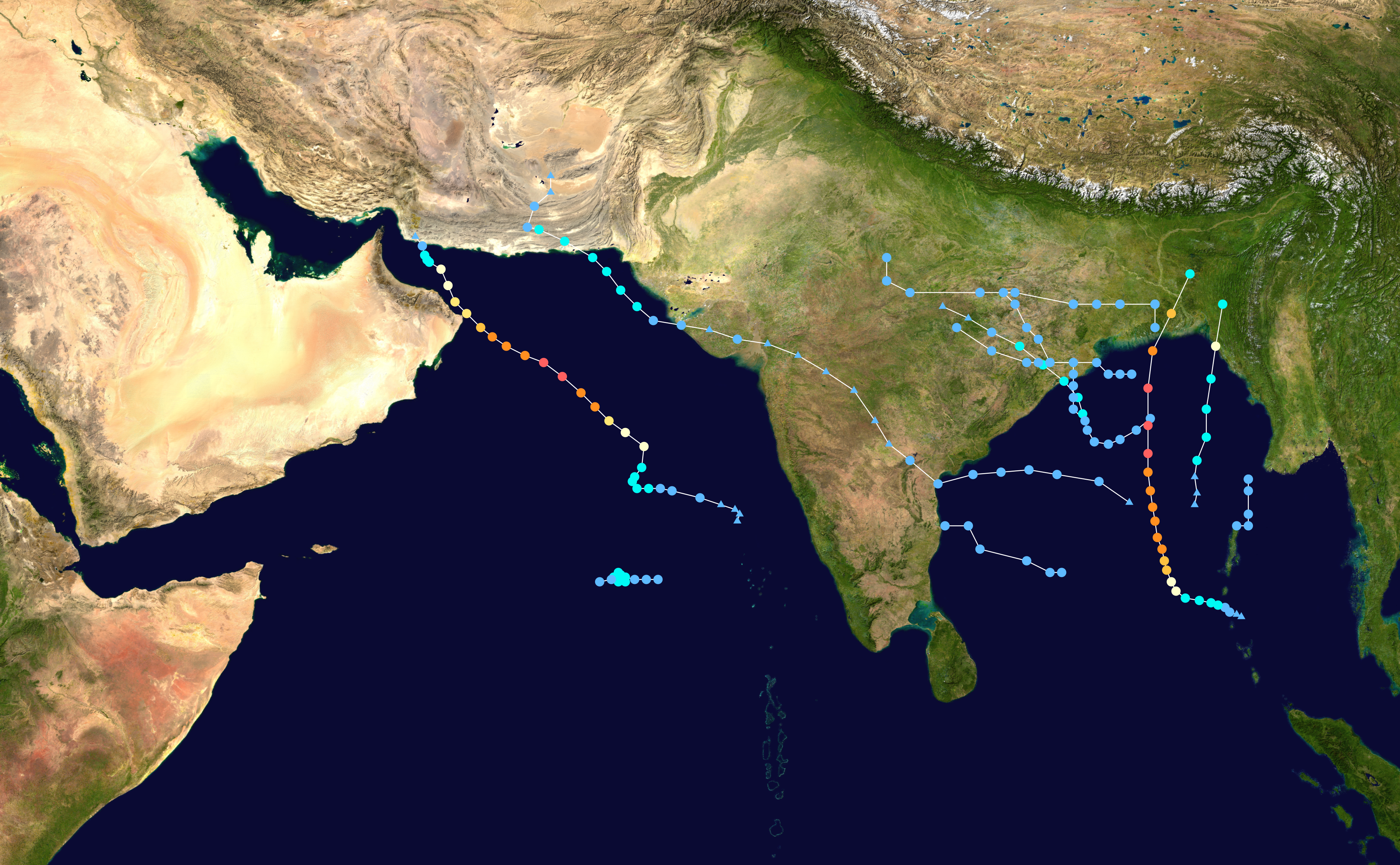
- Season summary map

Seasonal boundaries
- First system formed: May 1, 2007
- Last system dissipated: November 16, 2007

Strongest storm
- Name: Gonu
  - Maximum winds: 240 km/h (150 mph) (3-minute sustained)
  - Lowest pressure: 920 hPa (mbar)

Seasonal statistics
- Depressions: 12
- Deep depressions: 9
- Cyclonic storms: 4
- Severe cyclonic storms: 2
- Very severe cyclonic storms: 2
- Extremely severe cyclonic storms: 2
- Super cyclonic storms: 1
- Total fatalities: At least 16,248 total
- Total damage: ~ $9.71 billion (2007 USD)

Related articles
- Timeline of the 2007 North Indian Ocean cyclone season; 2007 Atlantic hurricane season; 2007 Pacific hurricane season; 2007 Pacific typhoon season

The 2007 North Indian Ocean cyclone season was one of the most active North Indian Ocean cyclone seasons on record. The North Indian Ocean cyclone season has no official bounds, but cyclones tend to form between April and December, with peaks in May and November. These dates conventionally delimit the period of each year when most tropical cyclones form in the northern Indian Ocean.

The scope of this article is limited to the Indian Ocean in the Northern Hemisphere, east of the Horn of Africa and west of the Malay Peninsula. There are two main seas in the North Indian Ocean — the Arabian Sea to the west of the Indian subcontinent, abbreviated ARB by the India Meteorological Department (IMD); and the Bay of Bengal to the east, abbreviated BOB by the IMD.

The official Regional Specialized Meteorological Centre in this basin is the India Meteorological Department (IMD), while the Joint Typhoon Warning Center releases unofficial advisories. The tropical cyclone scale for this basin is detailed on the right. On average, 4 to 6 storms form in this basin every season.

2007 was an active year for this basin; it was the most destructive season in known history at this time, only for the 2008 season to surpass it the next year. 2007 was also the first season to have multiple Category 5 cyclones (by the Saffir Simpson Scale), and the two Category 5's, Sidr and Gonu, were also the first named Category 5 cyclones to form in their respective seas; Gonu in the Arabian Sea, and Sidr in the Bay of Bengal. Some other notable storms of the season include Akash and Yemyin, both of which caused substantial damage and deaths. At least 4,545 deaths were reported, and damage was about 6.4 billion dollars.

== Systems ==
=== Depression BOB 01 ===
- Depression (IMD)
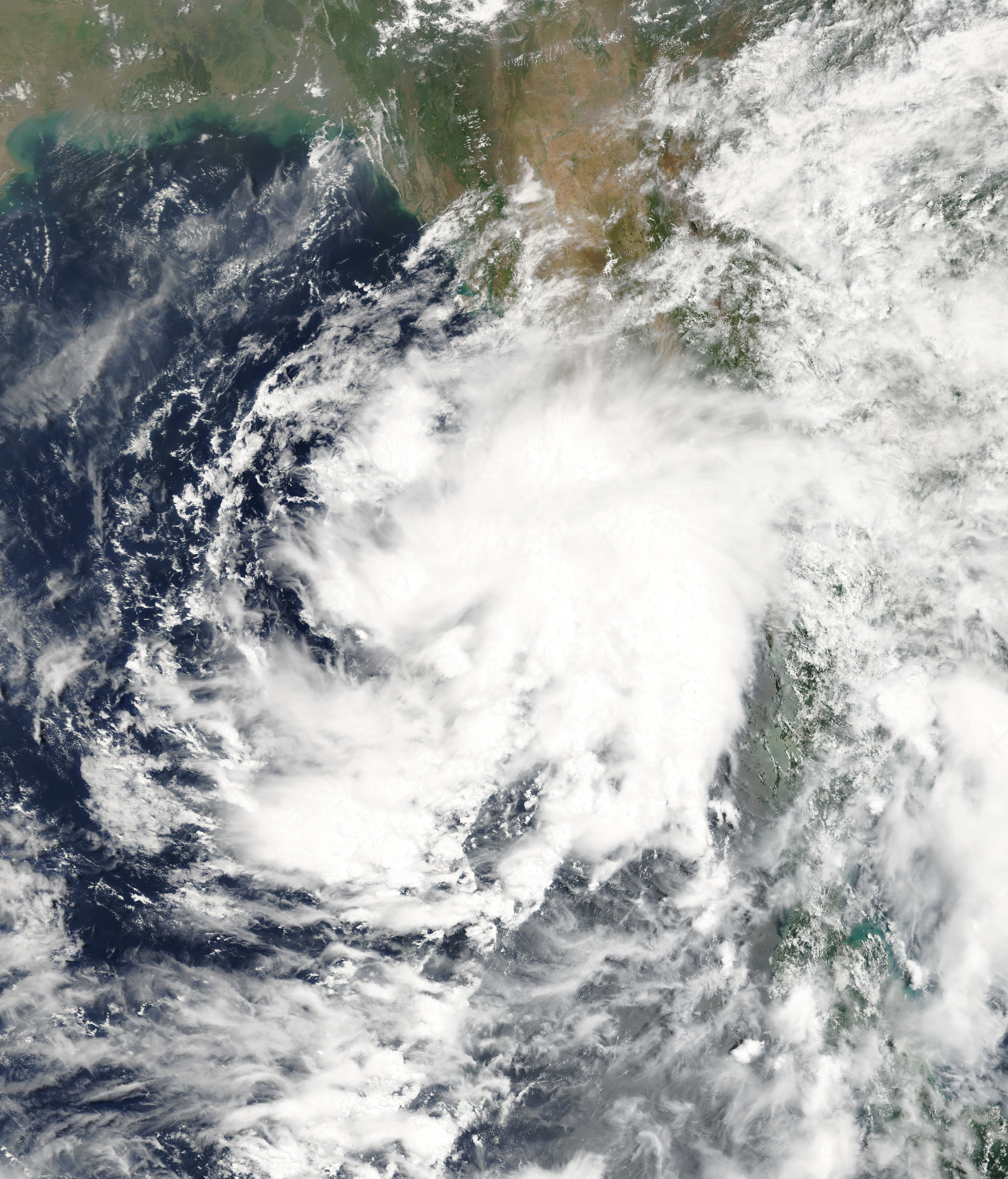
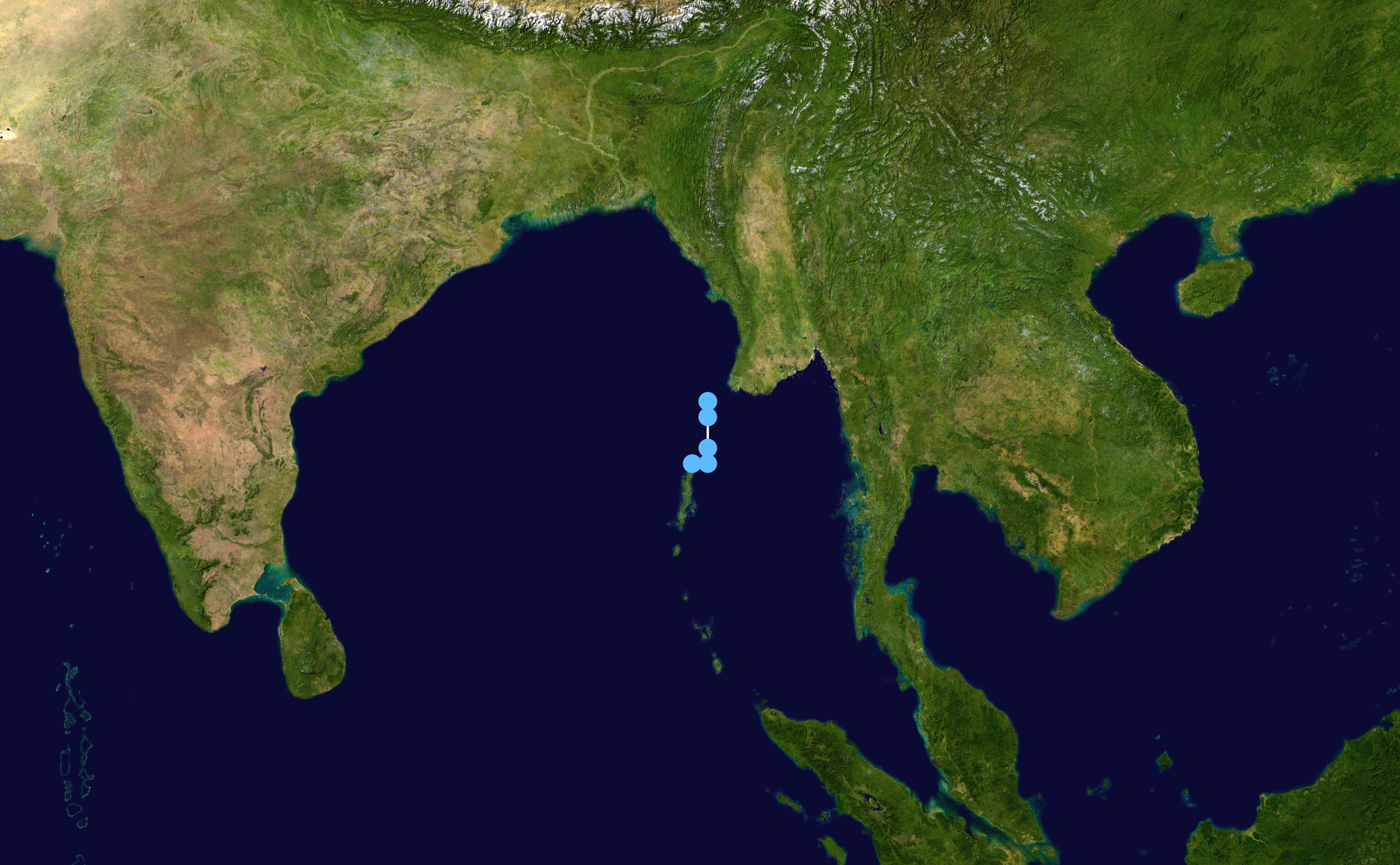
- Duration: May 1 – May 5
- Peak intensity: 45 km/h (30 mph) (3-min); 998 hPa (mbar)

An area of disturbed weather first formed east of the Malay Peninsula on April 26. It slowly consolidated, and the Thai Meteorological Department (TMD) designated the active low pressure area as a tropical depression on May 1 in the Gulf of Thailand. Moving westwards, it made landfall in the coastal areas of Chumphon, and then moved into the Andaman Sea. The system strengthened slightly, and late on May 3, the India Meteorological Department (IMD) designated it as a depression. It then began to move northwards, and in the morning of May 5, it made a second landfall on the coast of Rakhine State in Myanmar. The system weakened into an area of low pressure shortly after, and the IMD issued its last bulletin.

The TMD issued heavy rain and flash flood warnings for western provinces during the system's passage over the Isthmus of Kra. In Ratchaburi Province, disaster response teams prepared for the evacuation of settlements in mountainous terrain on May 3. The next day, Prachuap Khiri Khan Province was declared a disaster zone after low-lying areas were flooded with waters up to one metre deep. In the capital municipality, a prison was inundated, necessitating the evacuation of prisoners to Ratchaburi. In addition, a portion of rail was flooded, but train services were not disrupted. In Surat Thani Province, mudslides halted traffic in the municipal area. Multiple landslide warnings were also issued in other provinces. Northwestern provinces also braced for heavy rains following the system's second landfall.

TD2 caused about 18,485,400 Baht in damage.

This system was not considered to be a tropical depression by any other agencies while in the Gulf of Thailand, but was tracked by the Joint Typhoon Warning Center. The storm attained a maximum wind speed of 30 knots (56 km/h) and a minimum pressure of 1006 hPa.

- Operational Track provided by TMD

=== Cyclonic Storm Akash ===
- Cyclonic storm (IMD)
- Category 1 tropical cyclone (SSHWS)
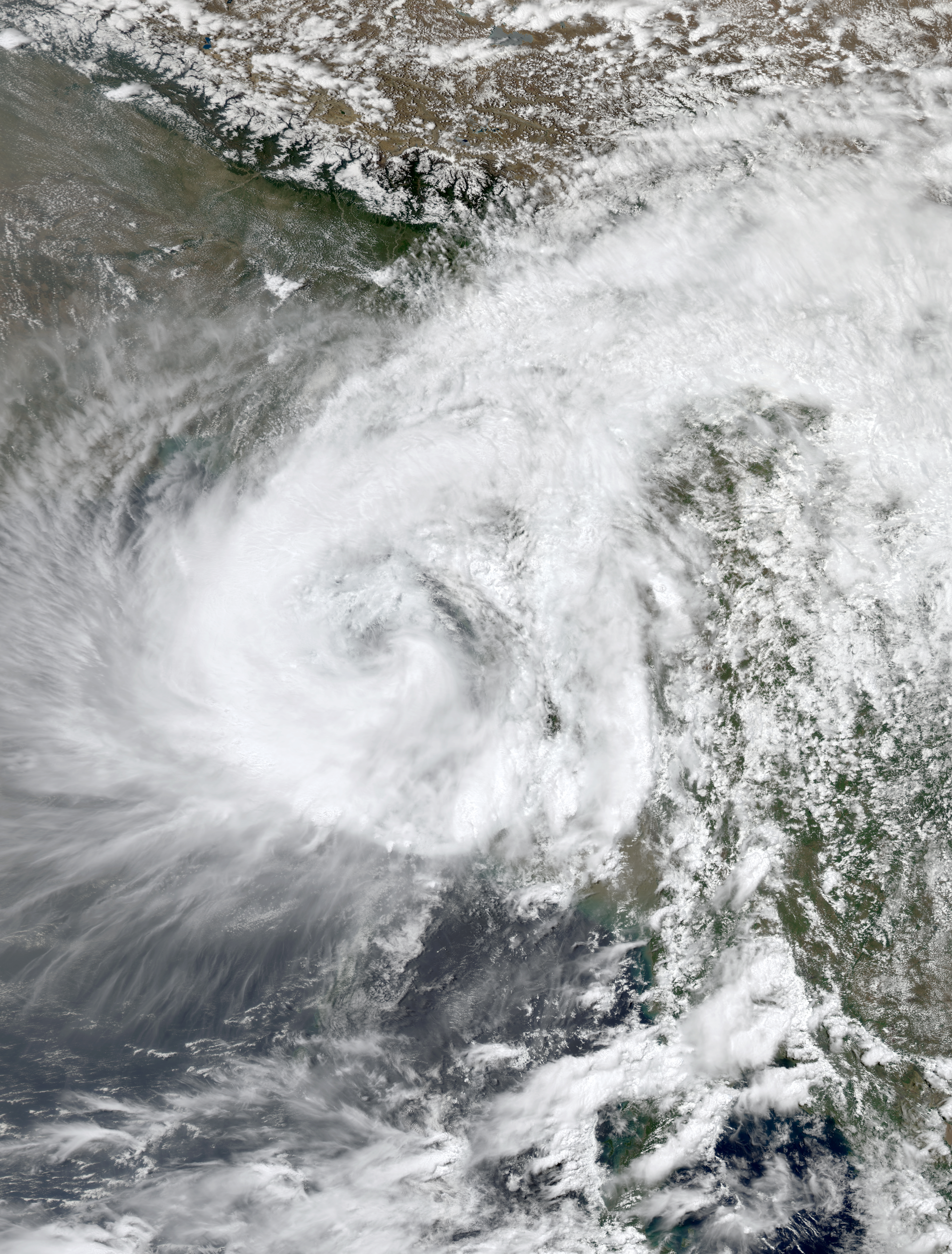
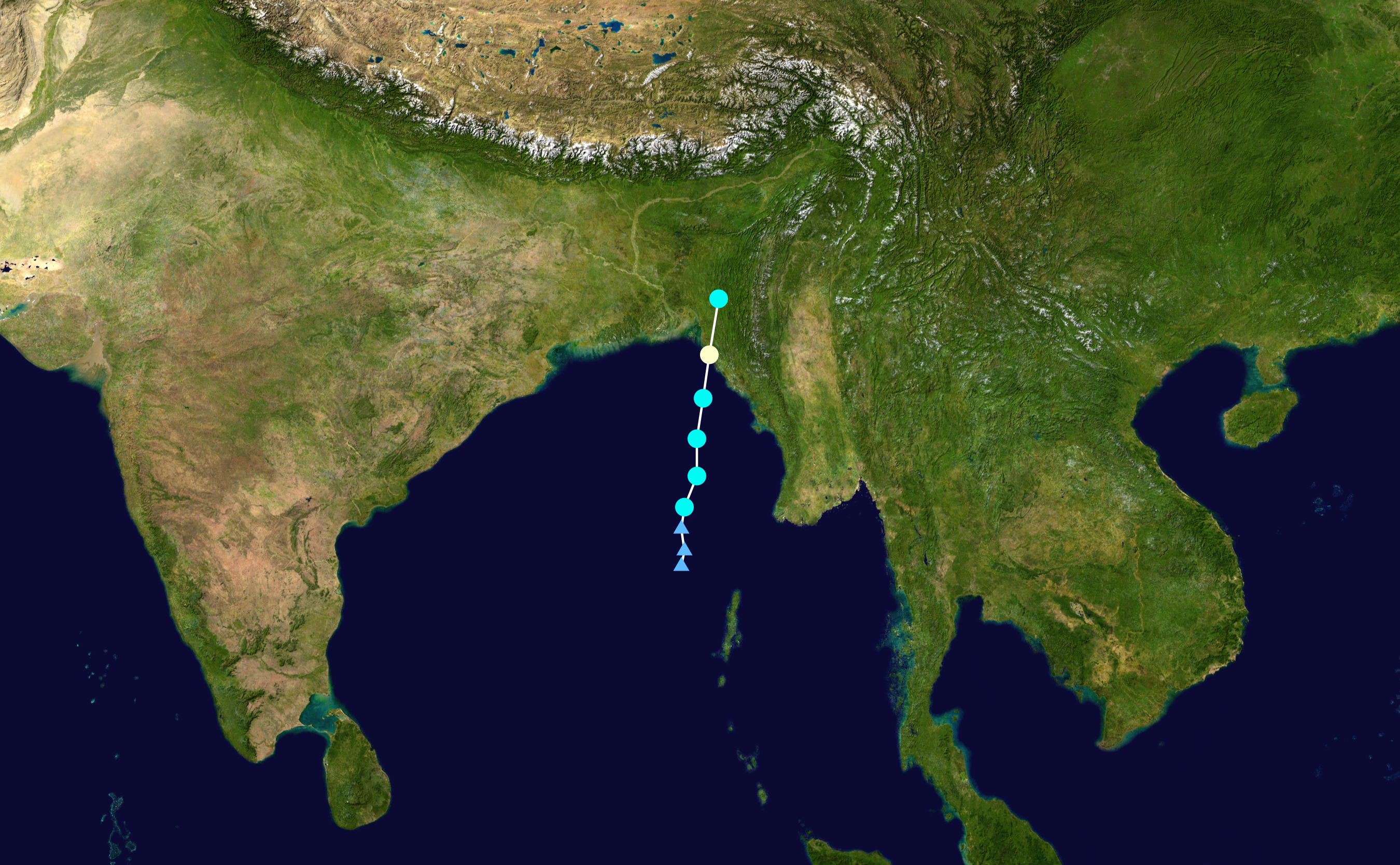
- Duration: May 13 – May 15
- Peak intensity: 85 km/h (50 mph) (3-min); 988 hPa (mbar)

On May 13, the India Meteorological Department declared a depression over the east central Bay of Bengal. It formed on May 10, and continued to intensify gradually. The Joint Typhoon Warning Center issued a TCFA on May 13 shortly before the IMD upgraded it to a depression. Later that day, the JTWC upgraded it to a tropical cyclone, designating it 01B. On May 14, the IMD upgraded it to a deep depression, and six hours later it was designated the first cyclonic storm of the season, Akash. (Note: The name Akash (Hindi: आकाश, [äːkäːʃ]) was contributed by India and means "sky" in Hindi.) Akash continued to strengthen and the JTWC analysed it as having reached hurricane-force winds on May 14. It made landfall on the coast near the Bangladesh–Myanmar border early on May 15, and weakened quickly inland.

Akash killed at least one fisherman, and left about 100 others missing. Crops were destroyed and power was cut as Akash neared the coast, and almost 80,000 people had to be evacuated to cyclone shelters. The seaport at Chittagong had to be closed, and all flights into and out of the city were cancelled. Heavy rains caused by the rainbands of the cyclone led to the third One Day International cricket match between India and Bangladesh being abandoned.

Overall, the storm killed at least 8 people in Myanmar.

=== Super Cyclonic Storm Gonu ===
- Super cyclonic storm (IMD)
- Category 5 tropical cyclone (SSHWS)
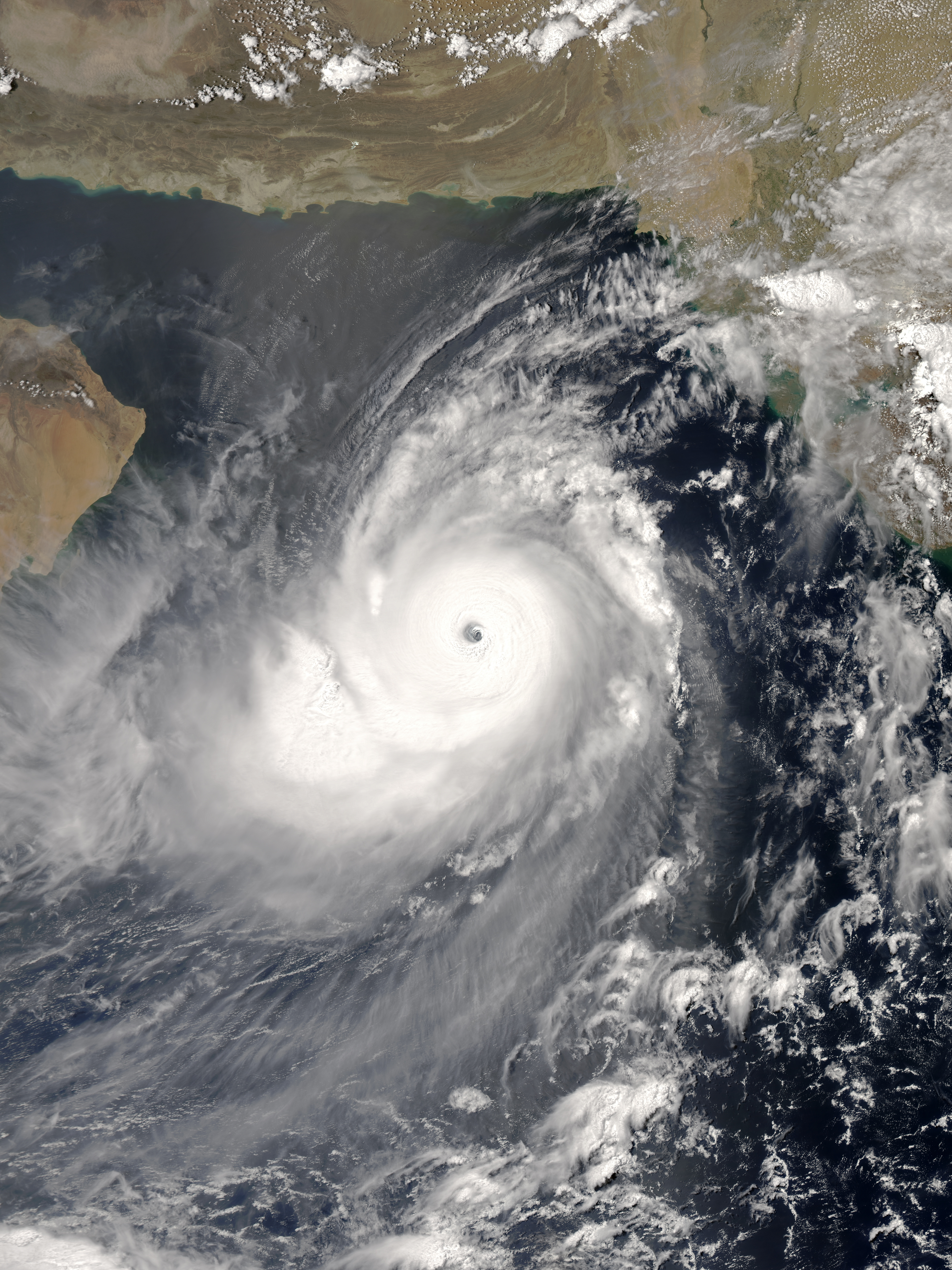
- Duration: June 1 – June 7
- Peak intensity: 240 km/h (150 mph) (3-min); 920 hPa (mbar)

Gonu developed from a persistent area of convection in the eastern Arabian Sea on June 1. (Note: The name Gonu (Dhivehi: ގޮނު, [go.nu]) was contributed by the Maldives and refers to the yellow boxfish (Ostracion cubicus) or woven bags made of palm leaves in Dhivehi.) With a favorable upper-level environment and warm sea surface temperatures, it rapidly intensified to attain peak winds of 240 km/h (150 mph) on June 3, as warned by the India Meteorological Department. Gonu weakened after encountering dry air and cooler waters, and late on June 5, Gonu made landfall on the easternmost tip of Oman, becoming the strongest tropical cyclone to hit the Arabian Peninsula. Intense cyclones like Gonu have been extremely rare over the Arabian Sea, as most storms in this area tend to be small and dissipate quickly.

The cyclone caused about $4.2 billion in damage (2007 USD) and 50 deaths in Oman, where the cyclone was considered the nation's worst natural disaster. Gonu dropped heavy rainfall near the eastern coastline, reaching up to 610 mm (24 in) which caused flooding and heavy damage. In Iran, the cyclone caused 28 deaths and $215 million in damage (2007 USD). Winds speeds of 100 km/h were recorded in Muscat, Oman at the time of landfall.

=== Deep Depression BOB 03 ===
- Deep depression (IMD)
- Tropical depression (SSHWS)
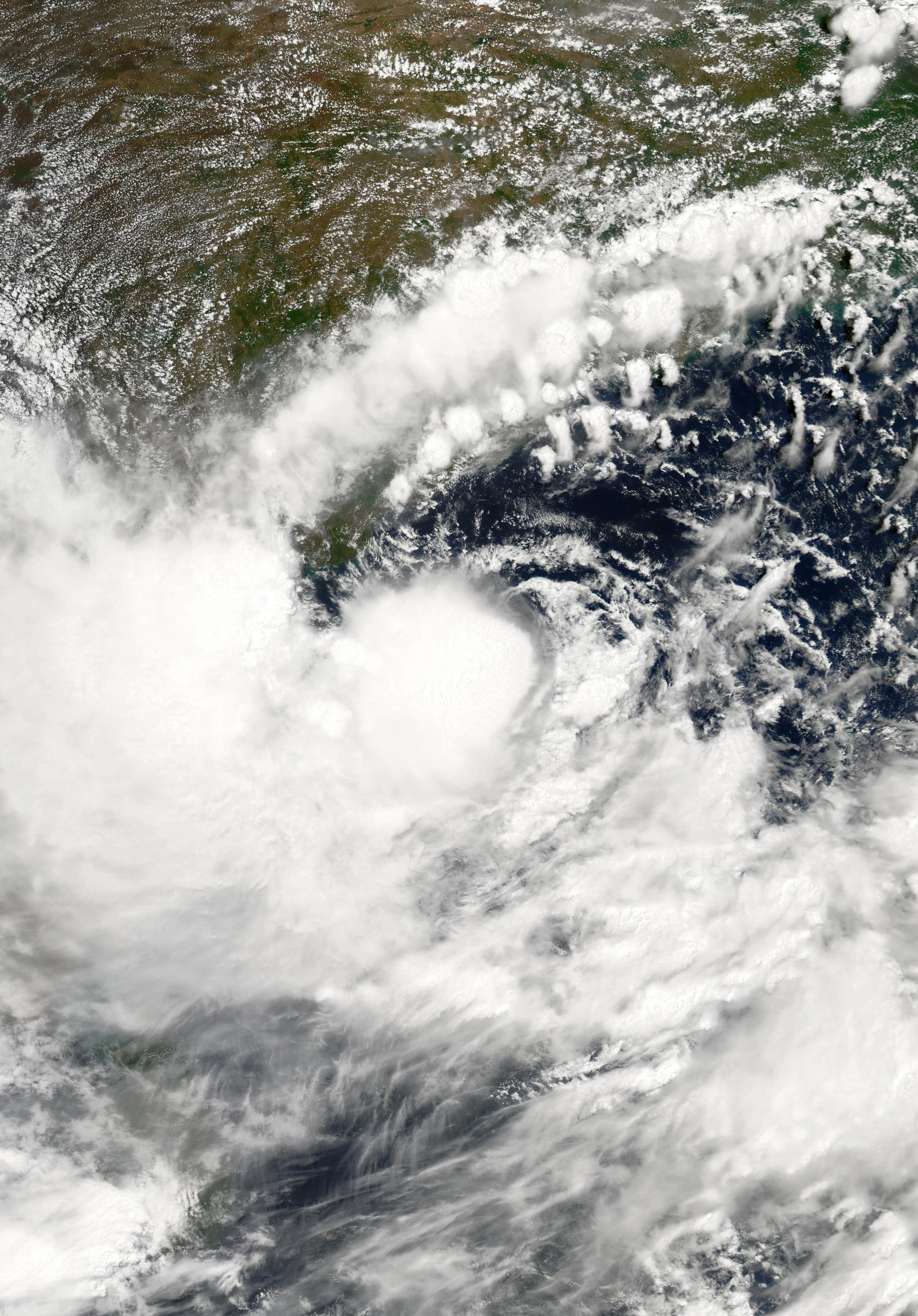
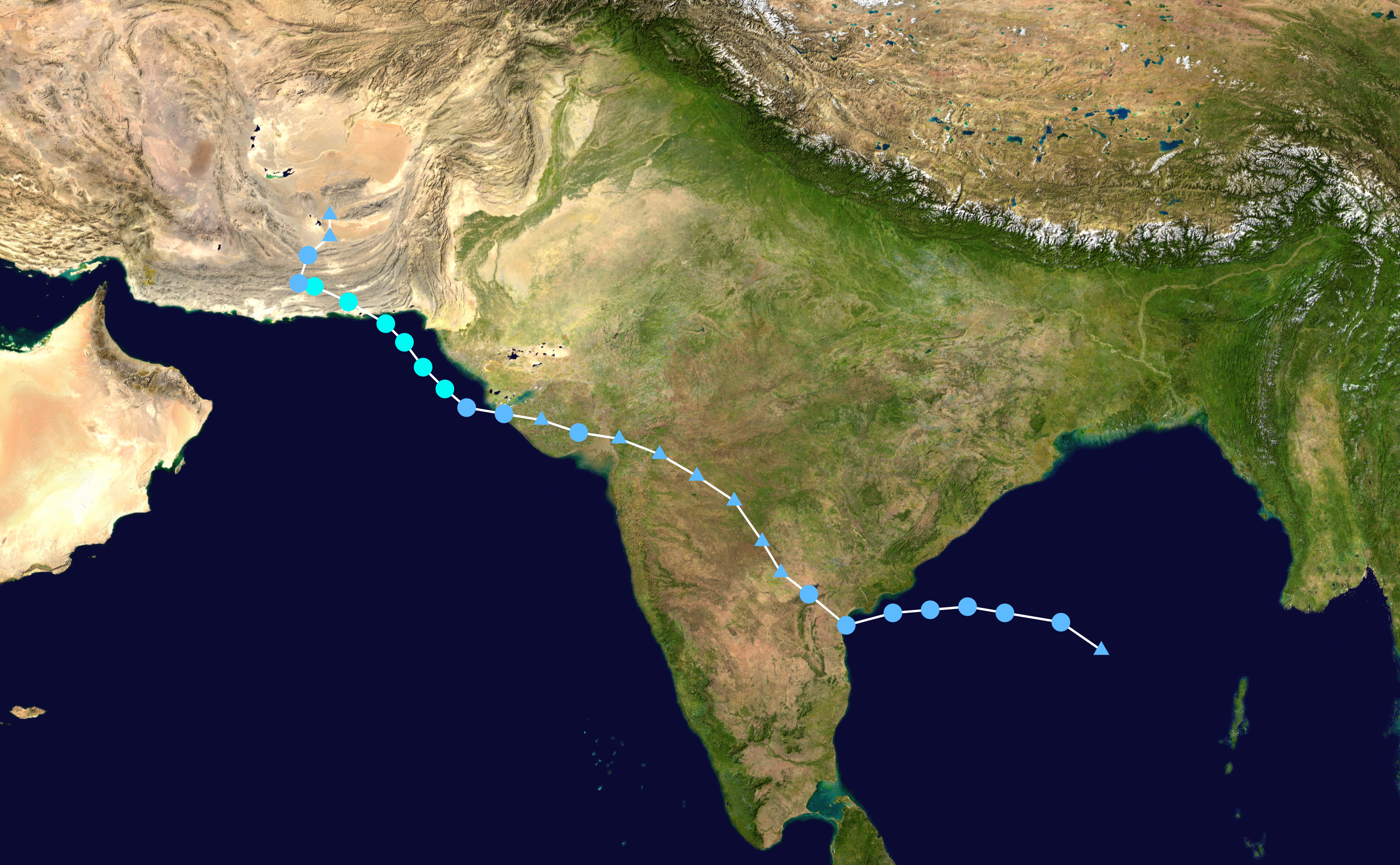
- Duration: June 21 – June 23
- Peak intensity: 55 km/h (35 mph) (3-min); 988 hPa (mbar)

A low-pressure area associated with the monsoon trough was first detected by the Naval Research Laboratory in the Bay of Bengal on June 17. Over the next few days, it developed deep flaring convection near an exposed low-level circulation centre (LLCC) as it drifted in the open sea. Despite moderate to high vertical wind shear, the disturbance produced surface pressure falls of up to 2.7 mbar (hPa) in Port Blair, in the Andaman Islands, on June 19. Convection persisted around the increasingly well-defined LLCC, and the disturbance continued to consolidate under favourable diffluence.

Early on June 21, the India Meteorological Department (IMD) declared the area a depression, 430 km (270 mi) east-southeast of Kakinada, Andhra Pradesh, India. Several hours later, the Joint Typhoon Warning Center (JTWC) issued a Tropical Cyclone Formation Alert (TCFA), with winds near 30 knots (56 km/h; 35 mph). The depression moved quickly west-northwest towards the northern Andhra Pradesh coast. A subtropical ridge to the north weakened the wind shear which had been hindering the storm's development, allowing for further intensification. Later that day, the IMD upgraded the system to a deep depression. As convection organised with increasing ocean heat content, the JTWC issued its first warning on Tropical Cyclone 03B.

The deep depression made landfall near Kakinda early on June 22 local time. The JTWC issued its final advisory later, as the system began to weaken due to land interaction and wind shear. The next day, the IMD downgraded it to a depression while it crossed the Deccan Plateau. The final warning was issued on June 24, despite the storm having moved into the Arabian Sea. The storm killed at least 140 people in India, and another 213 people died in Karachi, Pakistan from rains and winds that might have been associated with an outer band of the cyclone. The Pakistan Meteorological Department (PMD) had warned of heavy rains and wind from the system as early as Friday June 22.

=== Cyclonic Storm Yemyin ===
- Cyclonic storm (IMD)
- Tropical storm (SSHWS)
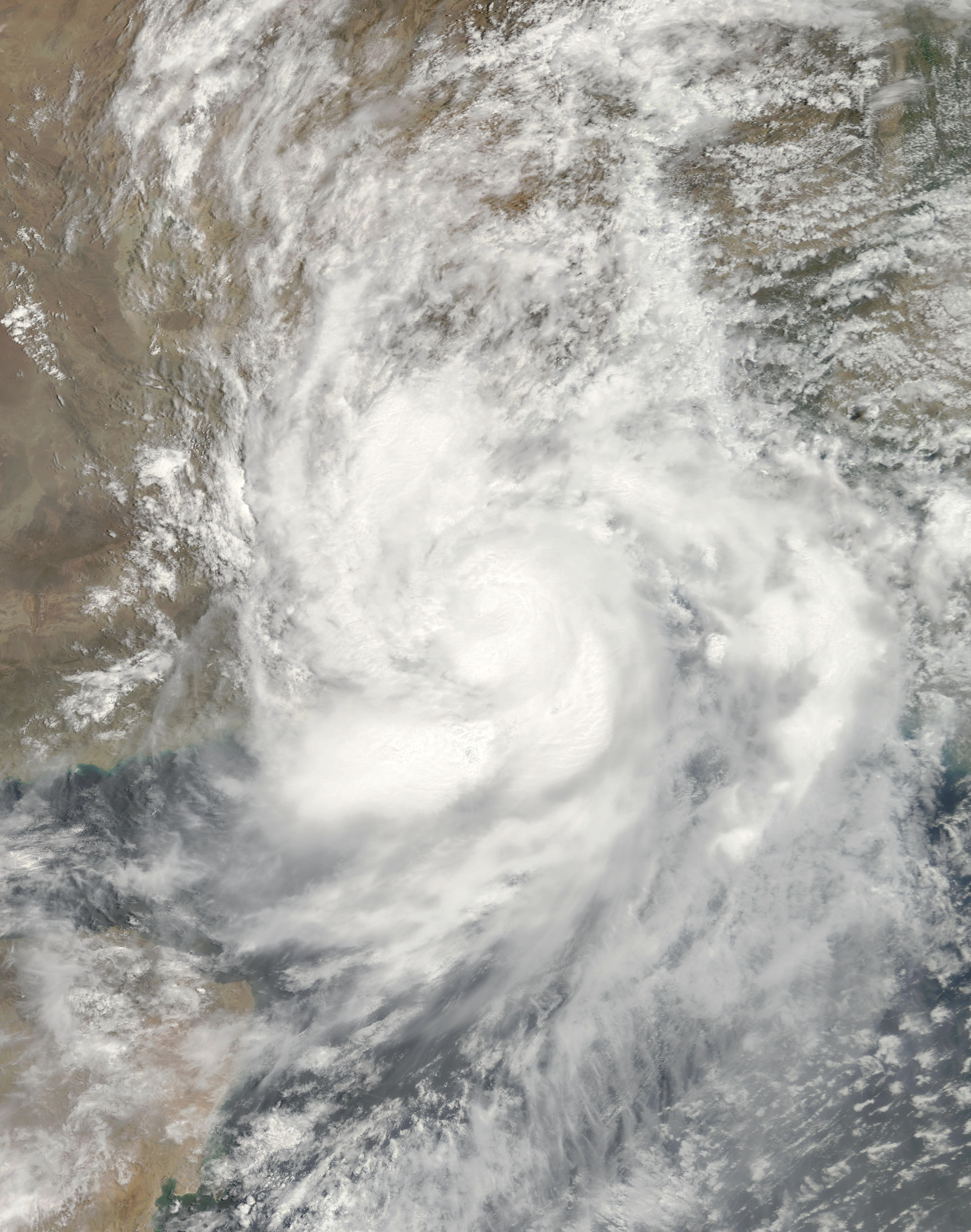
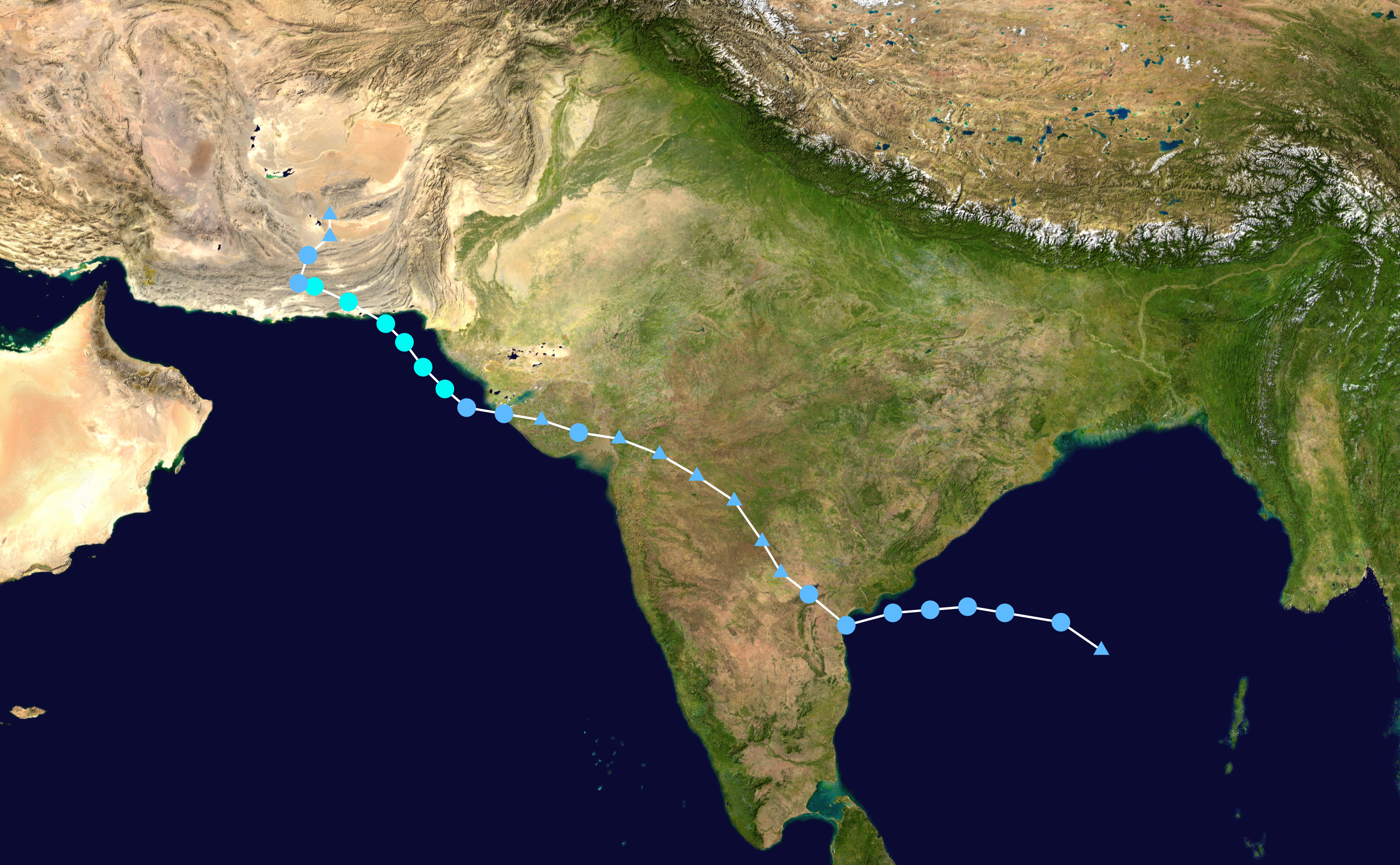
- Duration: June 25 – June 26
- Peak intensity: 65 km/h (40 mph) (3-min); 986 hPa (mbar)

The JTWC noted in its Significant Tropical Weather Outlook for the North Indian Ocean on June 24 that strong monsoonal low-level flow contributed to increased cyclonic vorticity, with low vertical wind shear and warm sea surface temperatures. It warned that these factors could lead to a rapid regeneration of BOB 03. Early on June 25, the JTWC issued the second TCFA for this system as its circulation crossed the coast into the Arabian Sea. Shortly after the JTWC resumed advisories on the depression, while IMD considered it as a separate system from BOB 03.

As it moved northwest just off the Pakistan coast, winds of about 26 knots (48 km/h; 30 mph) and a surface pressure of 990 mbar (hPa) were observed in Karachi near midday on June 25. According to the PMD, the centre of the system reached within 90 km (56 mi) of Karachi. With favourable conditions and deep convection, the system intensified into a deep depression that day. After further organization, it made its second landfall at about 0300 UTC June 26 along the Makran coast, near Ormara and Pasni, Balochistan province, in southwestern Pakistan. Upon reaching land, the cyclone began to weaken slowly, and the JTWC issued its last advisory late on June 26.

The cyclone trapped 2 merchant ships: Al-Picaso and Lady Hamad, and 4 fishing boats: Al-Taif, Al-Noor, Sumbal Sultani and Al-Tariq, 100 nmi (190 km; 120 mi) off Karachi. The Pakistan Navy rescued 56 sailors from the merchant ships and 36 fishermen from the fishing boats after they were detected by Breguet Atlantique aircraft. The heavy downpour also flooded the Kech Korandi riverine, inundating the city of Turbat and causing more than 10,000 people to evacuate their houses. At least 380 people died in Balochistan, with another 250 dead in Sindh and 100 in the North-West Frontier Province, and further rains associated with the remnants of the cyclone hampered rescue efforts. The cyclone affected at least 10 districts of Balochistan and 4 districts of Sindh, affecting the lives of at least 1.5 million people. Over 80 people were killed in floods associated with the remnants in Afghanistan. At least 2 million people were affected by the cyclone or indirectly by power cuts and water shortages in Balochistan.

The PMD referred to the deep depression as Tropical Cyclone Yemyin, the next name on the list at the time. The IMD did not operationally name the system, but the depression was upgraded to a cyclonic storm in post-analysis, and the IMD retroactively named it Yemyin. (Note: The name Yemyin (Burmese: ရေမြင်း, [jè.mjɪ́ɴ]) was contributed by Myanmar and means "hippopotamus" in Burmese.)

=== Deep Depression BOB 04 ===
- Deep depression (IMD)
- Tropical storm (SSHWS)
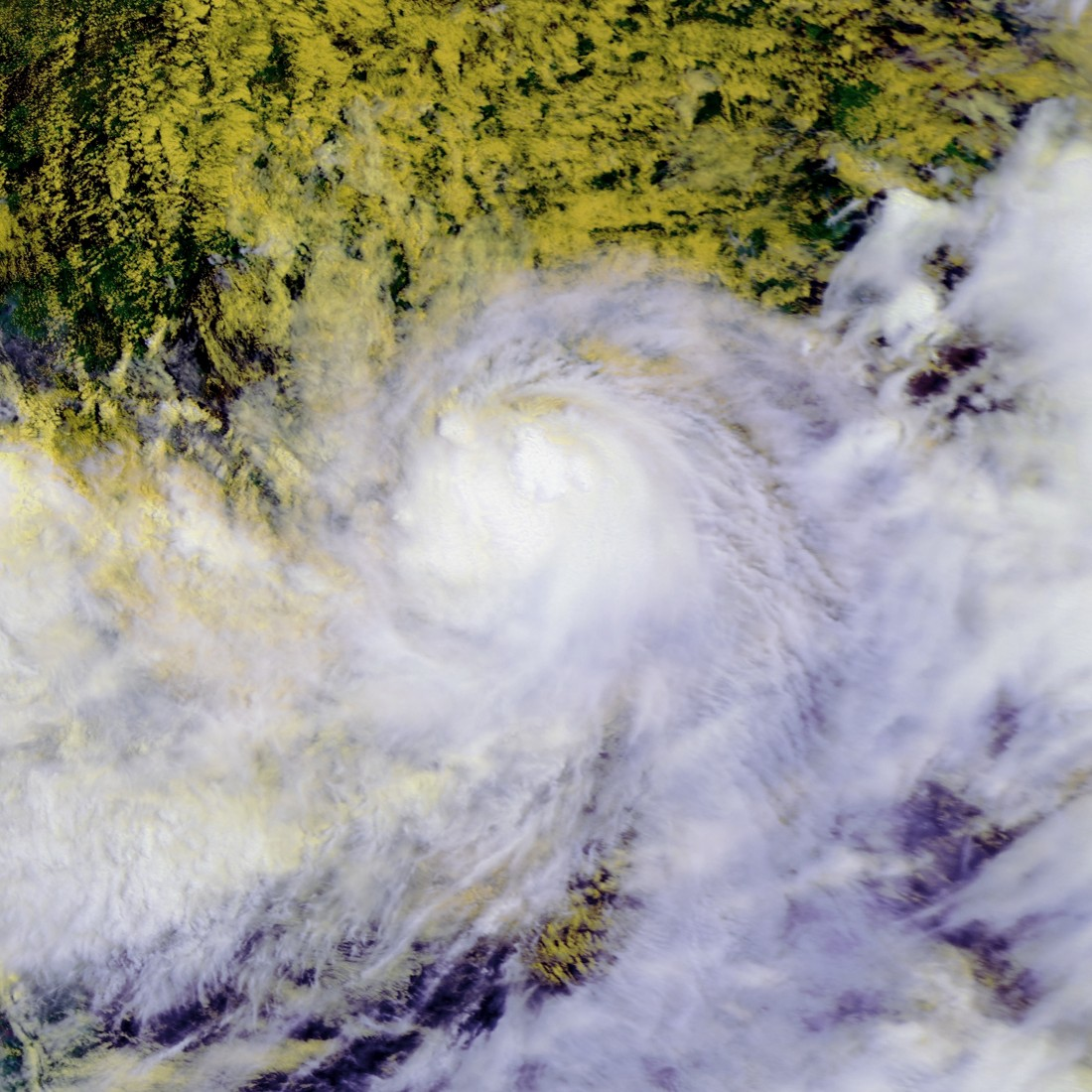
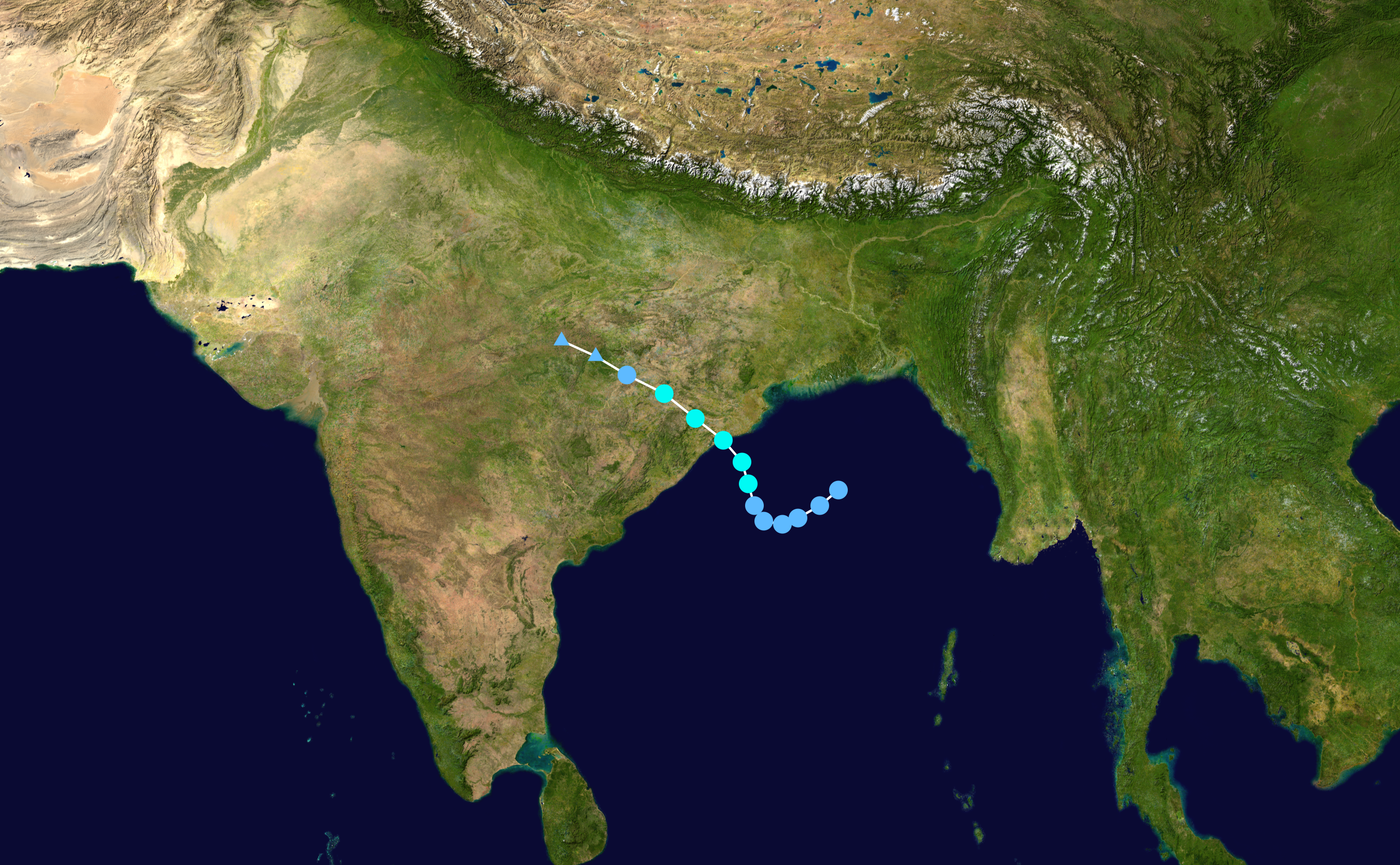
- Duration: June 28 – June 30
- Peak intensity: 55 km/h (35 mph) (3-min); 989 hPa (mbar)

On June 28, an area of disturbed weather in the Bay of Bengal that had persisted as a well-marked low pressure area for two days became more organised. The India Meteorological Department (IMD) noted the formation of a depression around 0000 UTC (5:30 am IST) southeast of Puri, Orissa, India. The IMD also stated that the system intensified into a deep depression three hours later whilst remaining "practically stationary". The Joint Typhoon Warning Center (JTWC) issued a Tropical Cyclone Formation Alert shortly after, noting that observations from the eastern coast of India had recorded falls in pressure corresponding with the system's development. Furthermore, an upper-level anticyclone had formed over the disturbance, which would maintain the favourable wind shear conditions. The JTWC initiated advisories later that day, as the depression moved northwest towards the Orissa coast. The depression made landfall near Puri early on June 29. The JTWC then issued its last advisory later that day, as the system moved inland. Early on June 30, with the system centred over Madhya Pradesh and Chhattisgarh, the IMD downgraded the system to a depression, and discontinued advisories 6 hours later.

At 0600 UTC (11 a.m. PST) on June 28, the Pakistan Meteorological Department (PMD) issued its first advisory regarding the remnants of the system. The PMD stated that the remnants "had the potential" to cause widespread heavy rain with strong winds in Sindh, Balochistan, Azad Kashmir and North-West Frontier provinces. This could worsen conditions in areas already flooded by Tropical Cyclone Yemyin. In its fourth advisory on July 1, the PMD warned about the "high probability" of the system moving westward towards southern Sindh (instead of northwestward as previously projected), and regenerating over the Arabian Sea. The remnants of Tropical Cyclone 04B were mentioned in a Significant Tropical Weather Advisory from the JTWC early on July 2. After crossing the Deccan Plateau, convection was southwest of the centre, in the Arabian Sea, while multiple associated low-level circulation centres had yet to re-emerge, and were located in west-central India, north-northeast of Mumbai. The area had favourable upper-level divergence, but high vertical wind shear. Eventually, the circulation centre became fully exposed in unfavourable conditions, and the JTWC declared it "no longer suspect for development" later that day.

While it was over western India adjoining the Arabian Sea, the deep convection associated with the remnants of the cyclone brought heavy rains to Maharashtra, causing disruptions in transport due to floods and high winds in Mumbai. Amravati district, northeast of Mumbai, was also severely affected by floods. At least 43 people were killed in the state, and in Mumbai 243 mm (9.6 in) of rainfall was recorded. 14 died in Gujarat state, and evacuations were conducted. Up to 462 mm (18.2 in) of rain was received in Bharuch district.

=== Deep Depression BOB 05 ===
- Deep depression (IMD)
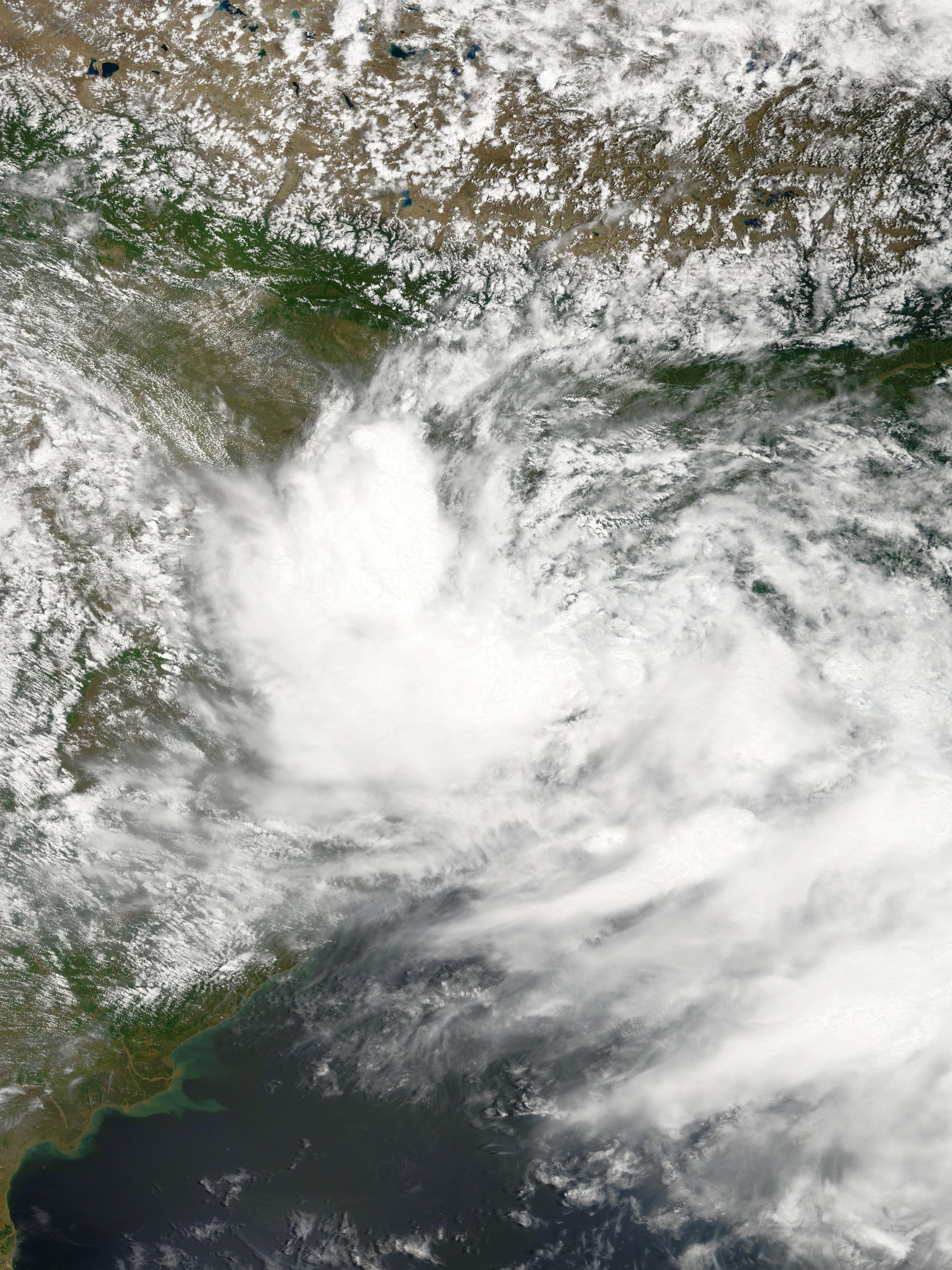
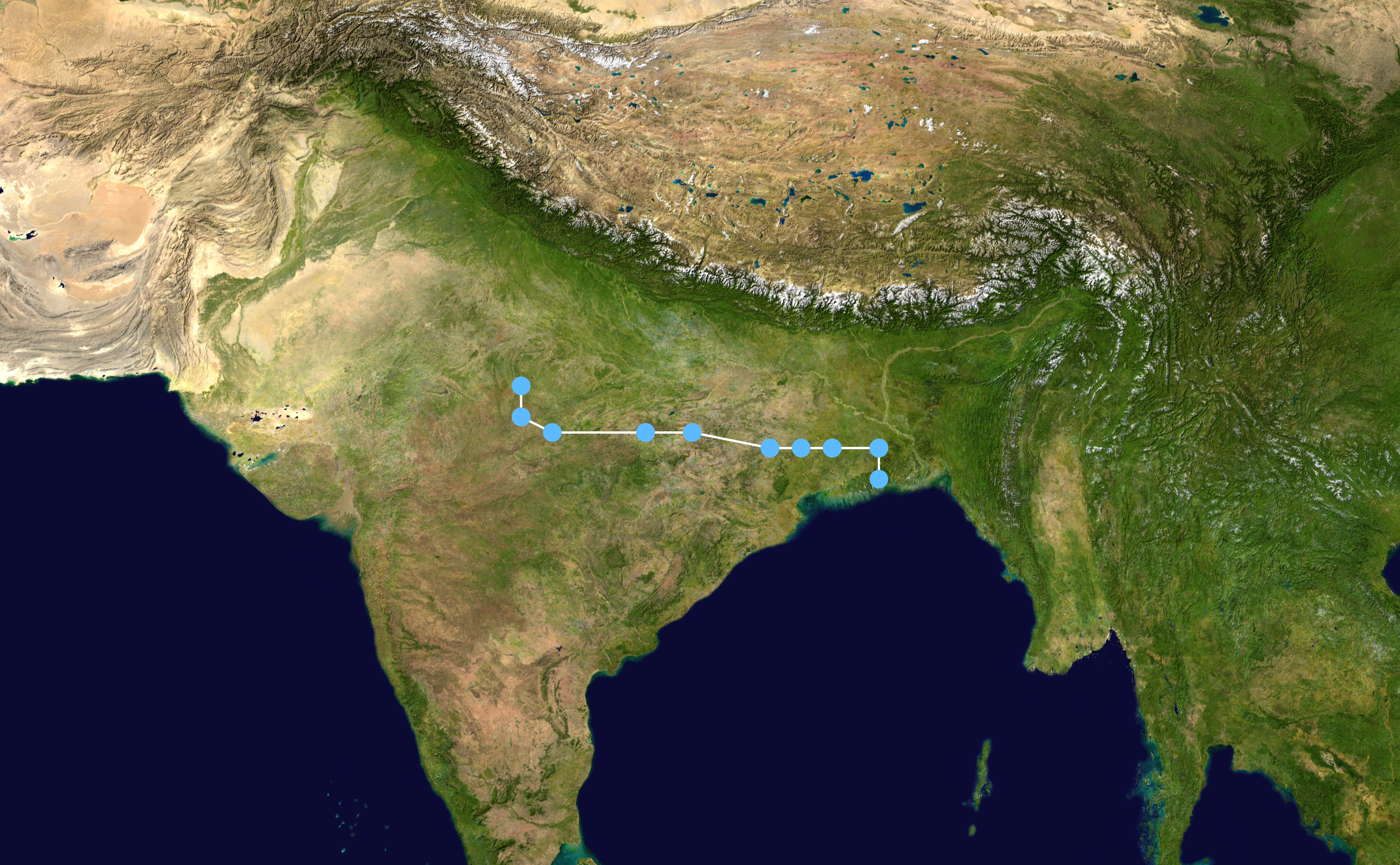
- Duration: July 4 – July 9
- Peak intensity: 55 km/h (35 mph) (3-min); 988 hPa (mbar)

On July 1, the Naval Research Laboratory (NRL) began to track a developing disturbance in the north Bay of Bengal. Following the formation of a low pressure area and circulation centre, the India Meteorological Department (IMD) initiated advisories, declaring it a depression, as it was located about 150 km (93 mi) southeast of Kolkata, West Bengal, in India, along the Bangladeshi coast. The system was noted in the Significant Tropical Weather Advisory issued by the Joint Typhoon Warning Center (JTWC) that same day. The JTWC commented that the consolidated circulation centre was already overland, in southwest Bangladesh. The next day, on July 5, as the depression tracked northwestward into Gangetic West Bengal, the IMD upgraded it to a deep depression. It reached close to Bankura early on July 6, moving westward. Phoolberia in West Bengal received 450 mm of rainfall in 48 hours between 5 and 6 July 2007.

As the system weakened while over north Chhattisgarh, the IMD downgraded it to a depression on July 7. The IMD then discontinued bulletins on July 8 as it weakened into a low pressure area over central Madhya Pradesh. However, early the next morning it reintensified into a depression near Shivpuri, in northwestern Madhya Pradesh, and the IMD resumed advisories. Later that day, the IMD issued its final bulletin.

The depression caused heavy rains in Kolkata, with 16 casualties. Nearly 20% of the cumulative rainfall for the entire monsoon season fell in three days.

=== Deep Depression BOB 06 ===
- Deep depression (IMD)
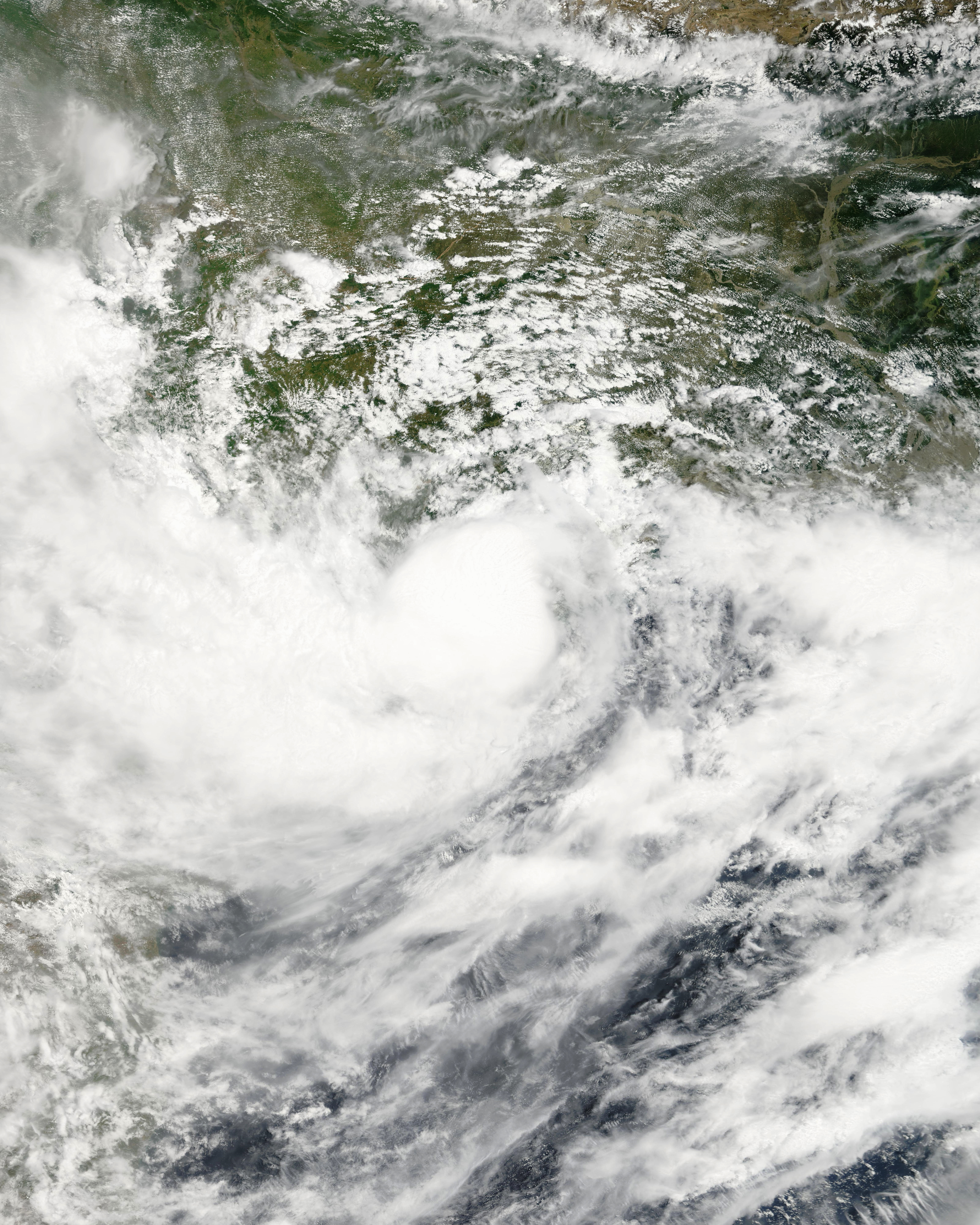
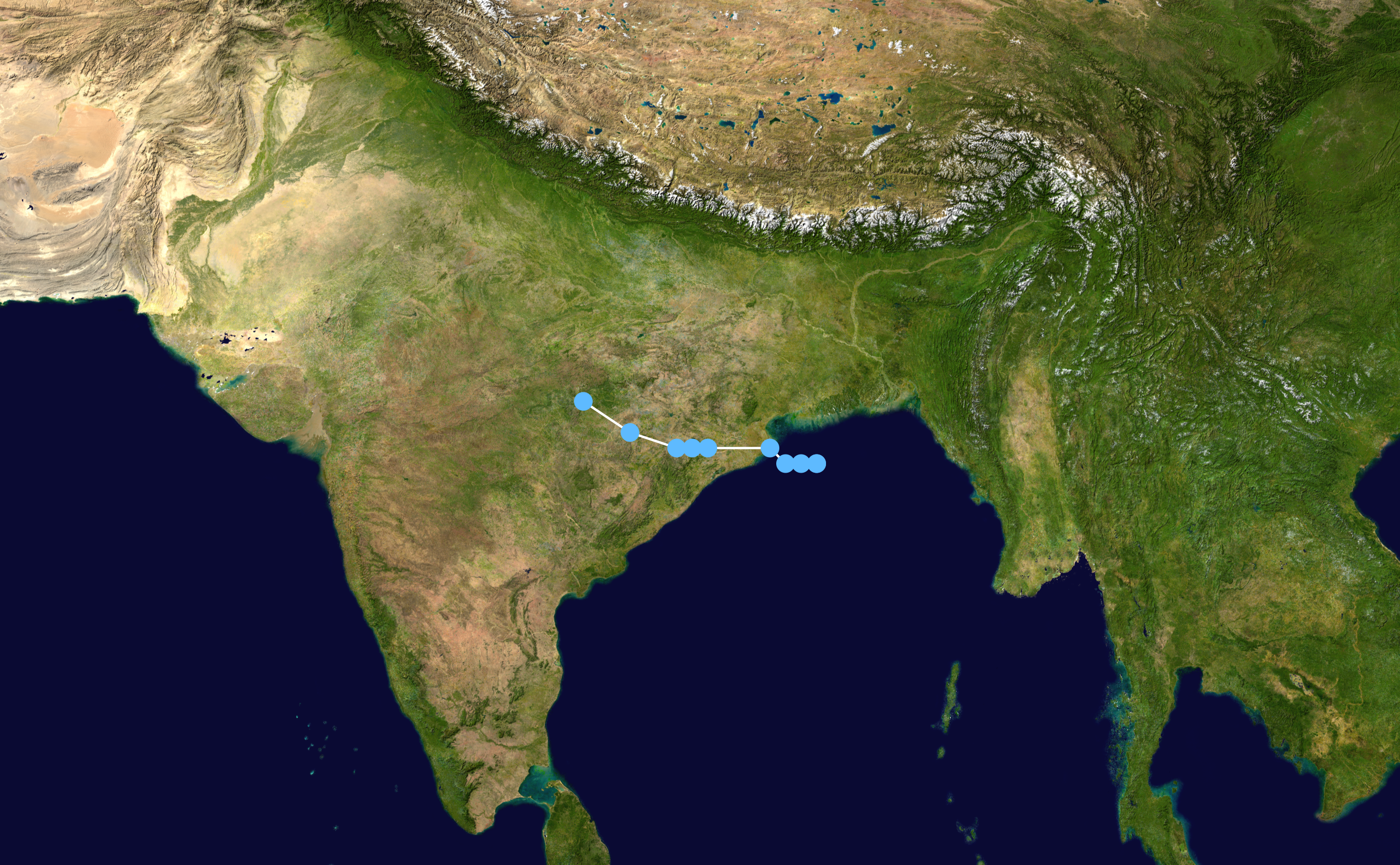
- Duration: August 5 – August 7
- Peak intensity: 55 km/h (35 mph) (3-min); 984 hPa (mbar)

On August 5, a low pressure area that had lingered in the northwestern Bay of Bengal organised into a depression about 230 km southeast of Balasore. The depression formed just as monsoonal rains and floods had killed over 200 people in the area. It deepened slightly and was upgraded to a deep depression late that night local time as it moved towards Orissa. The deep depression continued moving west-northwest and made landfall in Orissa between Chandbali and Paradip. In 48 hours, Alipingal in Orissa received 510 mm of rainfall between 5 & 6 August. In total 24 people died due to the flooding caused by the system.

On August 7, Pakistan Meteorological Department issued its first weather advisory regarding the probability of regeneration of the system in Arabian Sea after crossing the Indian state of Gujarat, though the system once again intensified into a deep depression but according to the IMD, it was a low pressure area.

=== Depression BOB 07 ===
- Depression (IMD)
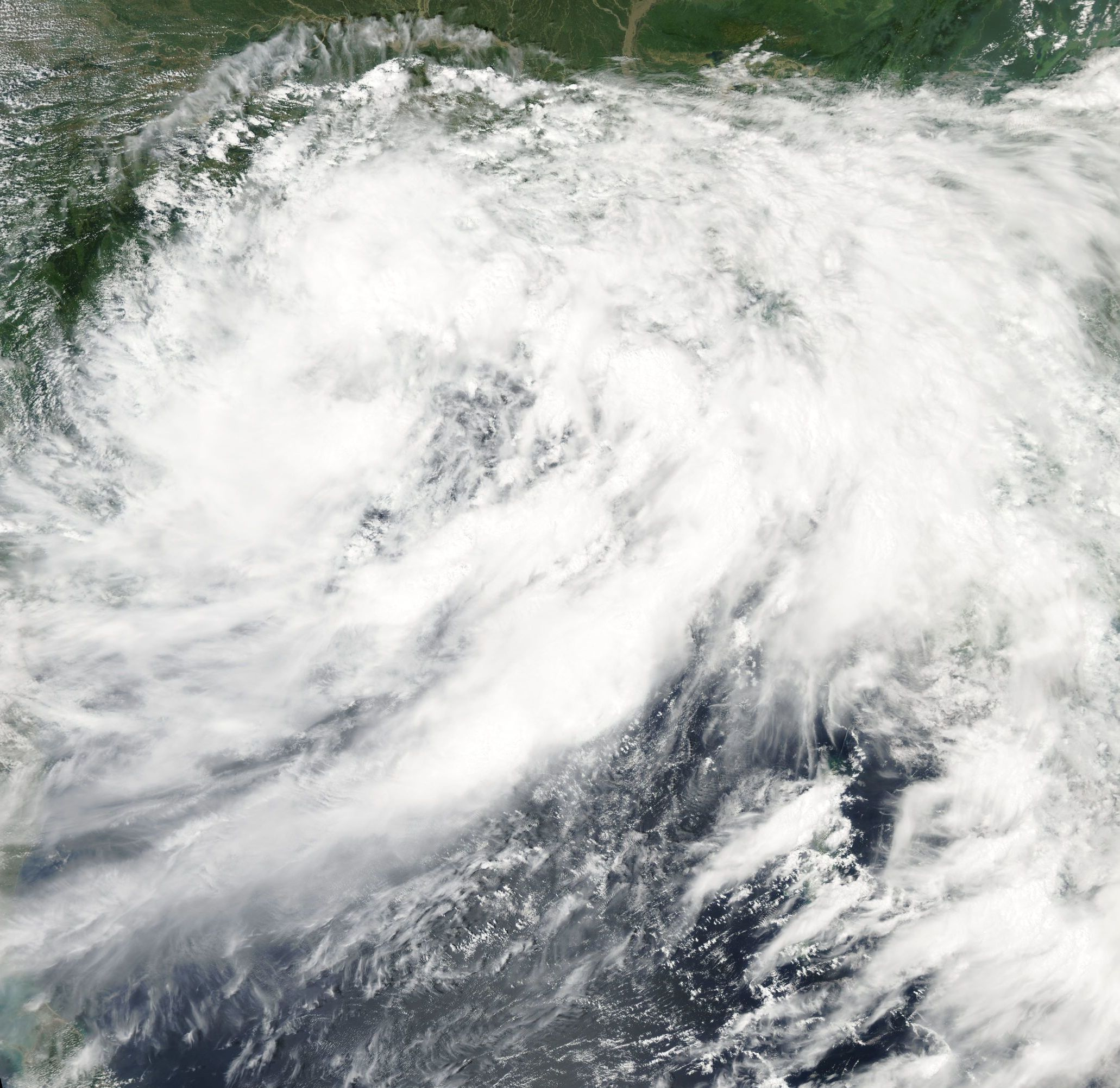
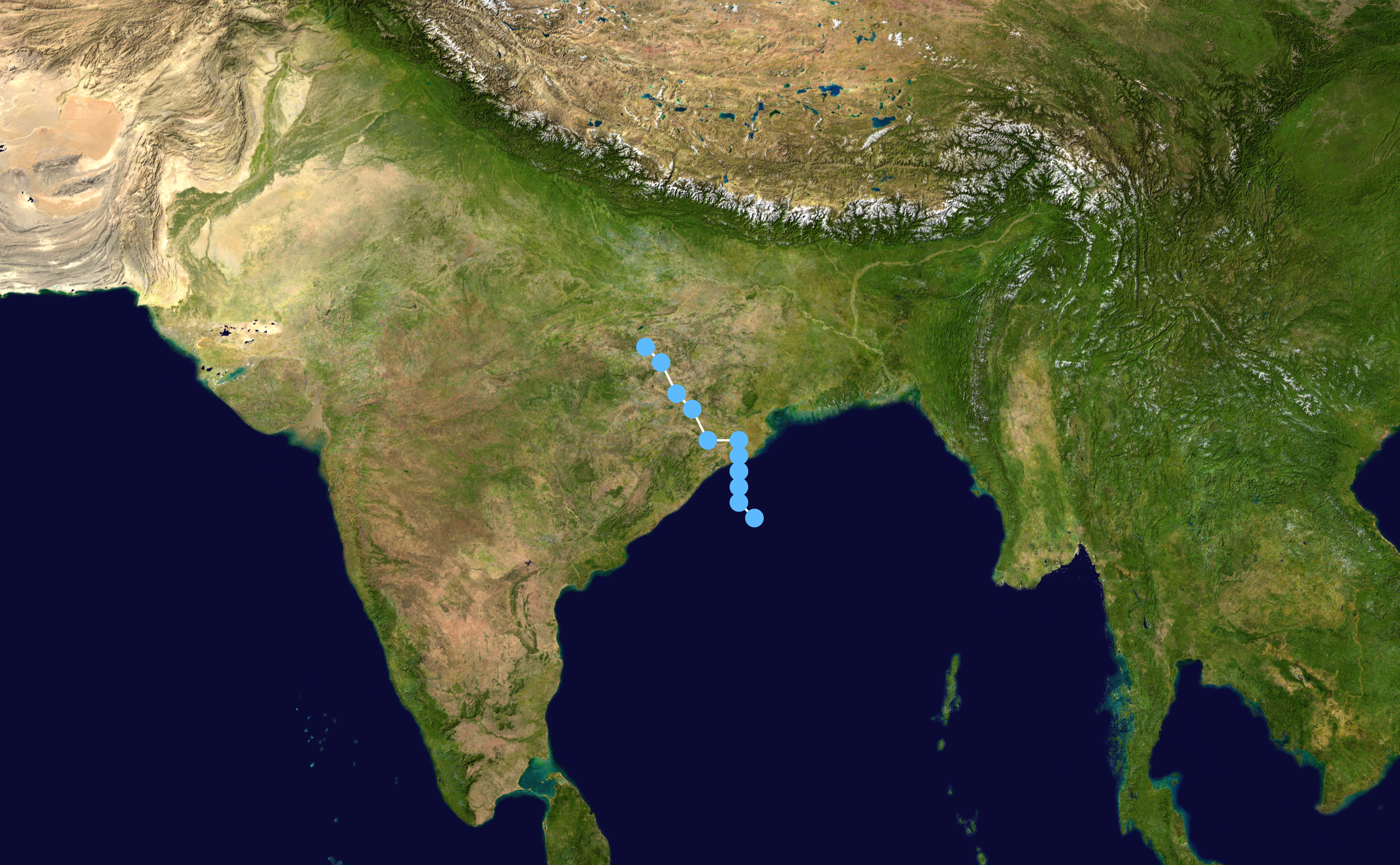
- Duration: September 21 – September 24
- Peak intensity: 45 km/h (30 mph) (3-min); 990 hPa (mbar)

On September 21, a low pressure area 230 km south-southeast of Puri was declared a depression by the IMD. The next day, it made landfall along the Orissa coast near Puri with winds around 45–55 km/h (28–34 mph). The city Kolkata in West Bengal received 440 mm of rainfall in 72 hours between 23 & 25 September. In total there were 75 deaths from the Depression.

=== Depression BOB 08 ===
- Depression (IMD)
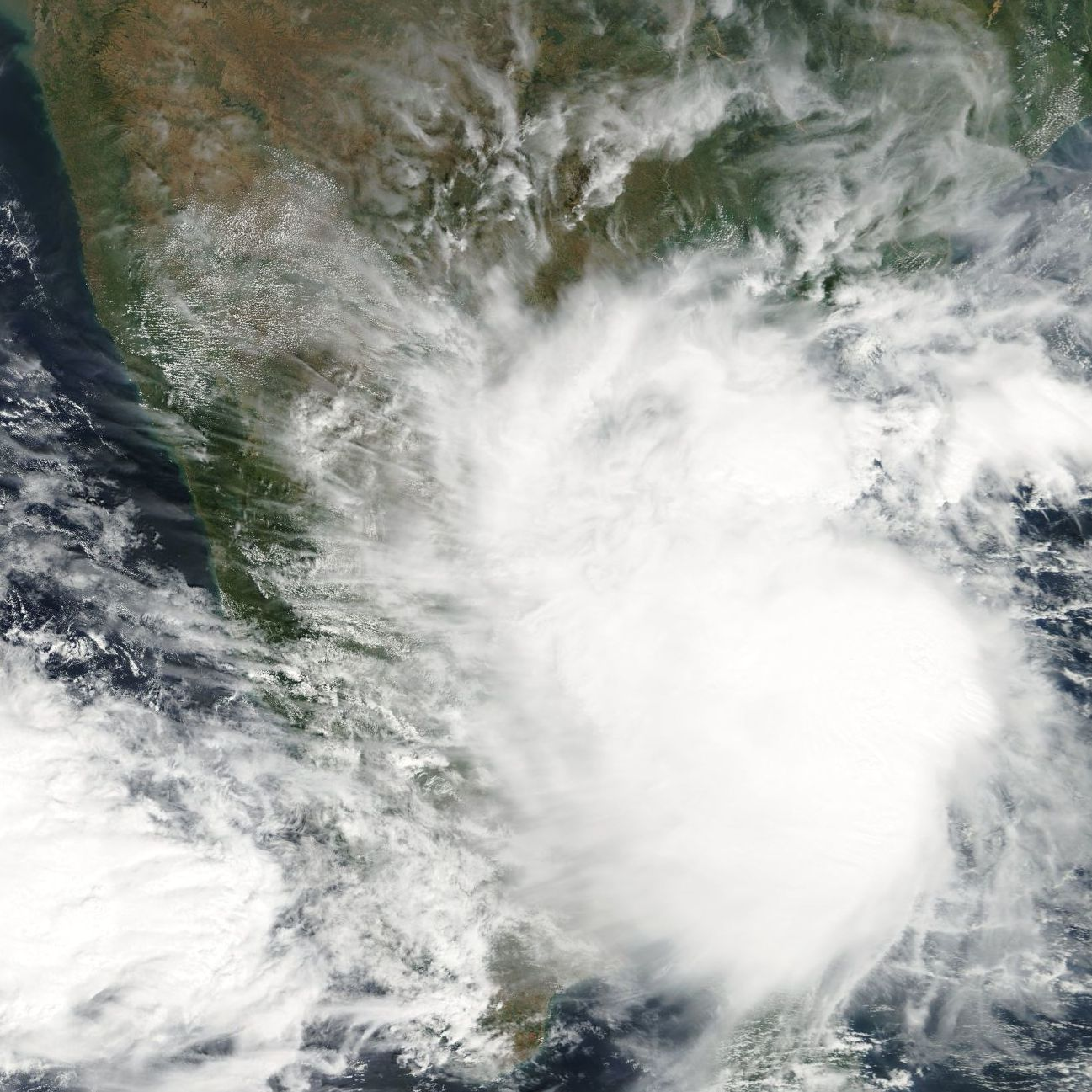
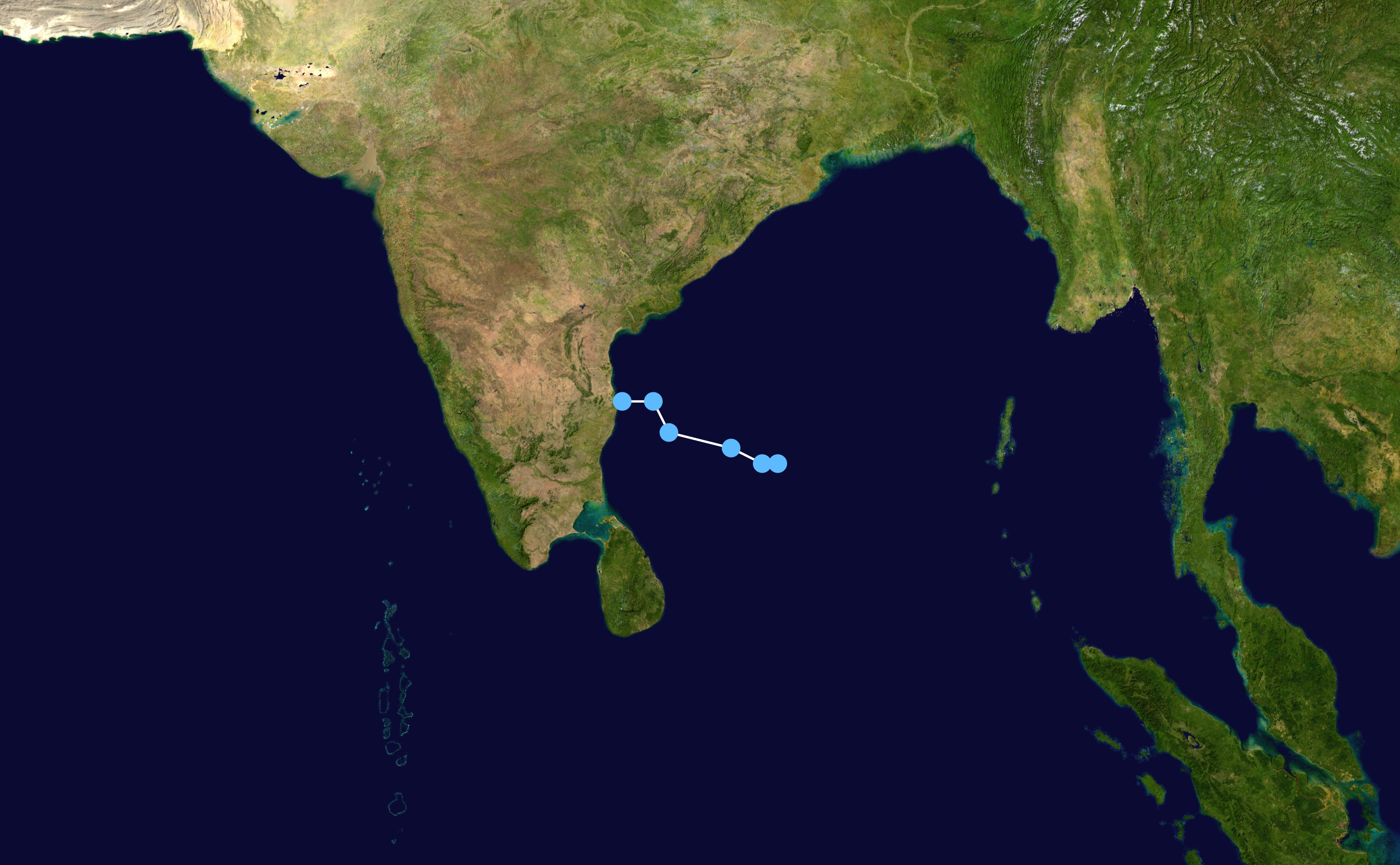
- Duration: October 27 – October 29
- Peak intensity: 45 km/h (30 mph) (3-min); 1004 hPa (mbar)

Late on October 27, an area of weather 600 km east-southeast of Chennai, India was designated Depression BOB 08/2007 by the IMD. The depression degenerated into a low pressure area early on the 29th. The depression caused heavy rains accompanied with strong winds in Chennai, with 15 casualties. Kavali in Andhra Pradesh received 550 mm of rainfall in 48 hours between 29 & 30 October. 19 deaths were reported from the state of Andhra Pradesh.

=== Deep Depression ARB 02 ===
- Deep depression (IMD)
- Tropical storm (SSHWS)
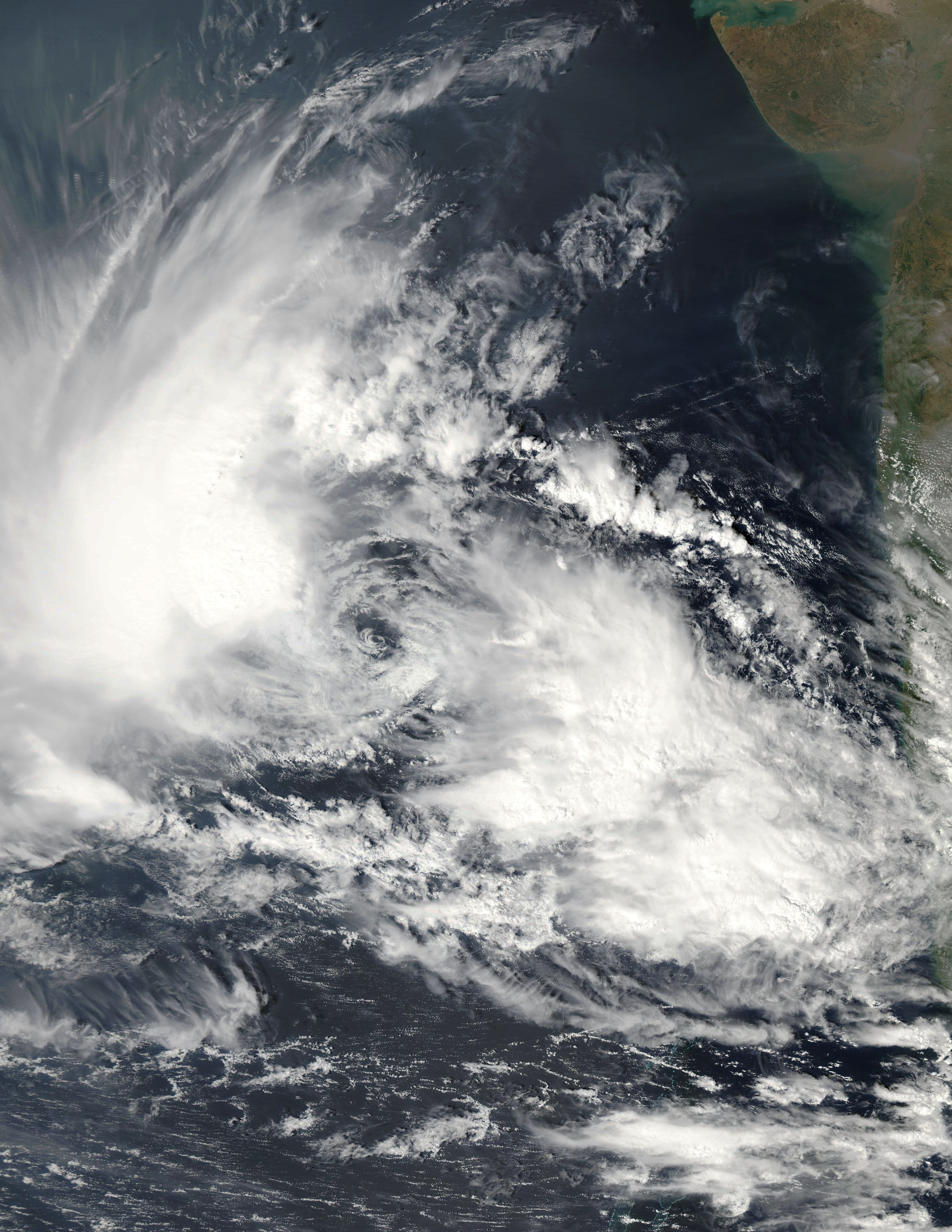
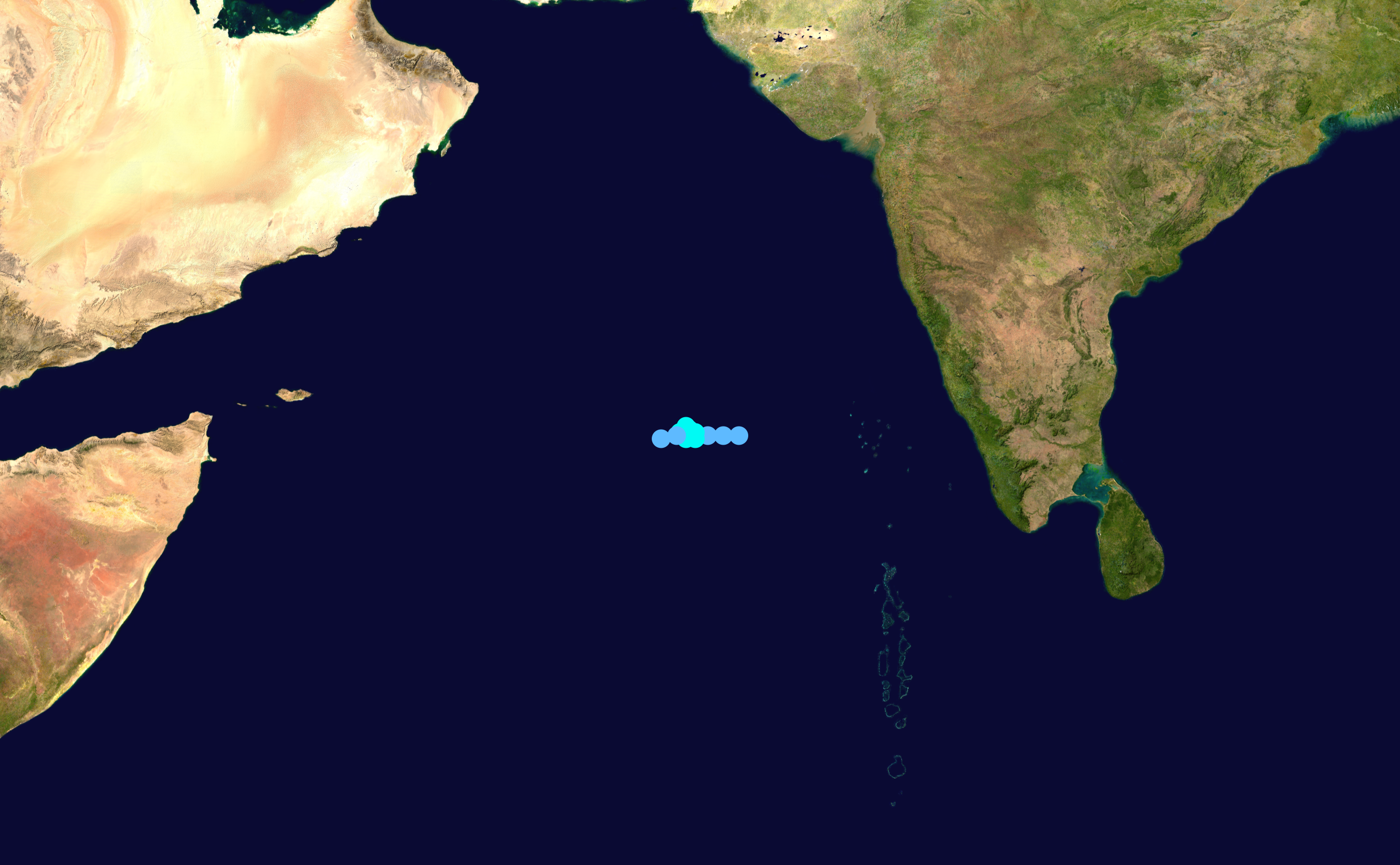
- Duration: October 27 – November 2
- Peak intensity: 55 km/h (35 mph) (3-min); 1000 hPa (mbar)

On October 27, a westward-moving disturbed area of weather formed about 885 nm east of Cape Guardafui, Somalia was designated Depression ARB 02/2007 by the IMD. The next day, the Joint Typhoon Warning Center designated the depression as Tropical Cyclone 05A. Soon after, the IMD upgraded the depression to a deep depression. The Deep Depression did not develop and degenerated into a low pressure area on November 2 as it moved further west. Agathi in Laskwadeep Islands received 70 mm of rainfall on 29 October.

=== Extremely Severe Cyclonic Storm Sidr ===
- Extremely severe cyclonic storm (IMD)
- Category 5 tropical cyclone (SSHWS)
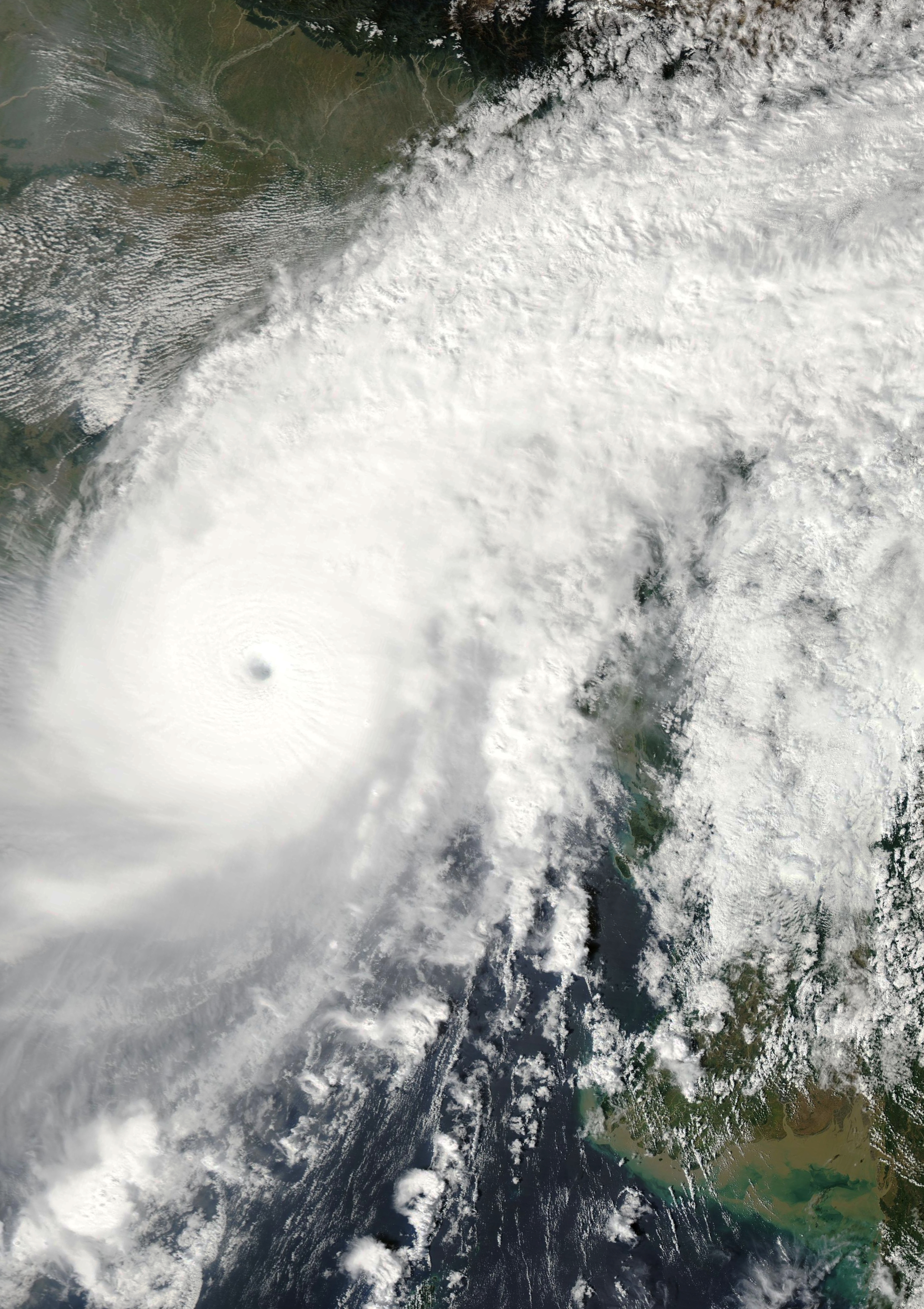
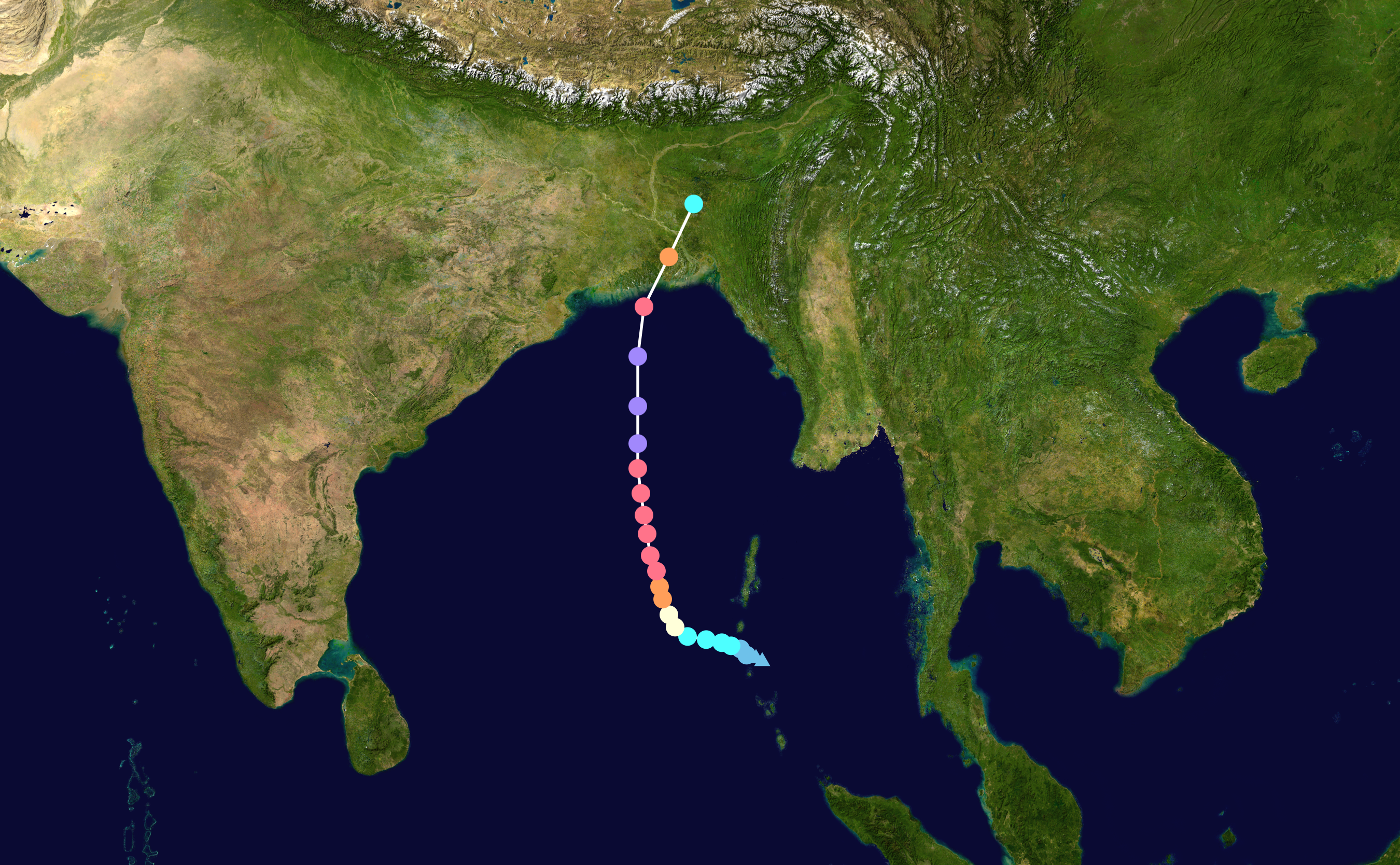
- Duration: November 11 – November 16
- Peak intensity: 215 km/h (130 mph) (3-min); 944 hPa (mbar)

An area of disturbed weather developed near the Andaman Islands on November 9. It gradually became better organised as it passed to the south of the islands, and the system was designated Depression BOB 09 by the India Meteorological Department early on November 11. The Joint Typhoon Warning Center upgraded it to Tropical Cyclone 06B at the same time. Later that day, it intensified into a deep depression as it moved slowly north-westward. The IMD upgraded the system to Cyclonic Storm Sidr early on November 12. (Note: The name Sidr (Arabic: سِدْر, [sidr]) was contributed by Oman and means buckthorn (Ziziphus spina-christi) in Arabic.) The system then began to intensify quickly as it moved slowly northwestward, and the IMD upgraded it to a severe cyclonic storm later that day and a very severe cyclonic storm early the next day.

As it intensified to a Category 4-equivalent cyclone on November 14, thousands of emergency officials were put on standby in eastern India and Bangladesh in advance of the storm's arrival. Massive evacuations of low-lying coastal areas also took place, although sheltering was only available for about 500,000 of the over 10 million residents of coastal areas. The IMD also issued a cyclone alert for Orissa and West Bengal on November 14. On the morning of November 15, the cyclone intensified to reach peak winds of 215 km/h (134 mph) according to the IMD, and a peak of 260 km/h (160 mph) according to the JTWC. Sidr officially made landfall around 1700 UTC later that day, with sustained winds of 215 km/h (134 mph). A station in coastal Bangladesh reported 80 knots (150 km/h) at 1800 UTC of 15 November 2007. According to media reports, the wind speed of about 200 km/h prevailed over Bangladesh coast at the time of landfall. It weakened quickly after landfall and the final advisories were issued early on November 16.

In the post season analysis, Sidr was upgraded to a Category 5-equivalent cyclone. This marks the first time that there have been two Category 5-equivalent storms in the Northern Indian Ocean in a single season.

== Season effects ==
This is a table of the storms in 2007 and their landfall(s), if any; the table does not include storms that did not make landfall, which is defined as the center of the storm moving over a landmass. Deaths in parentheses are additional and indirect (an example of an indirect death would be a traffic accident), but are still storm-related. Damage and deaths include totals while the storm was extratropical or a wave or low.

Name	Dates	Peak intensity			Areas affected	Damage (USD)	Deaths	Ref(s).
Name	Dates	Category	Wind speed	Pressure	Areas affected	Damage (USD)	Deaths	Ref(s).
BOB 01	May 1–5	Depression	45 km/h (28 mph)	998 hPa (29.47 inHg)	Thailand, Myanmar	$500,000	—N/a	
Akash	May 13 – 15	Cyclonic storm	85 km/h (53 mph)	990 hPa (29.24 inHg)	Andaman Islands, Nicobar Islands, Bangladesh, Burma	$982 million	14	
Gonu	June 1 – 7	Super cyclonic storm	240 km/h (150 mph)	920 hPa (27.17 inHg)	Western India, Oman, United Arab Emirates, Iran, Pakistan	$4.42 billion	78	
BOB 03	June 21 – 23	Deep depression	55 km/h (34 mph)	988 hPa (29.17 inHg)	India, Pakistan	Unknown	453	
Yemyin	June 25 – 26	Cyclonic storm	65 km/h (40 mph)	986 hPa (29.12 inHg)	India, Pakistan, Afghanistan	$2.1 billion	630	
BOB 04	June 28 – 30	Deep depression	55 km/h (34 mph)	989 hPa (29.18 inHg)	India	—N/a	57	
BOB 05	July 4 – 9	Deep depression	55 km/h (34 mph)	988 hPa (29.17 inHg)	Bangladesh	—N/a	16	
BOB 06	August 5 – 7	Deep depression	55 km/h (34 mph)	984 hPa (29.06 inHg)	India	—N/a	24	
BOB 07	September 21 – 24	Depression	45 km/h (28 mph)	990 hPa (29.24 inHg)	India	—N/a	75	
BOB 08	October 27 – 29	Depression	45 km/h (28 mph)	1004 hPa (29.65 inHg)	India	—N/a	34	
ARB 02	October 27 – November 2	Deep depression	55 km/h (34 mph)	1000 hPa (29.53 inHg)	Somalia	—N/a	—N/a	
Sidr	November 11 – 16	Extremely severe cyclonic storm	215 km/h (134 mph)	944 hPa (27.88 inHg)	Andaman Islands, Bangladesh, West Bengal, Northeast India, Southwest China	$2.31 billion	~15,000	
Season aggregates
11 systems	May 1 – November 16		240 km/h (150 mph)	920 hPa (27.17 inHg)		$9.81 billion	~16,381	

== See also ==
- Tropical cyclones in 2007
- North Indian Ocean tropical cyclone
- 2007 Atlantic hurricane season
- 2007 Pacific hurricane season
- 2007 Pacific typhoon season
- South-West Indian Ocean cyclone seasons: 2006–07, 2007–08
- Australian region cyclone seasons: 2006–07, 2007–08
- South Pacific cyclone seasons: 2006–07, 2007–08
