= Thai Meteorological Department =

Thai governmental agency responsible for weather forecasting and monitoring

Thai Meteorological Department (TMD)
- กรมอุตุนิยมวิทยา
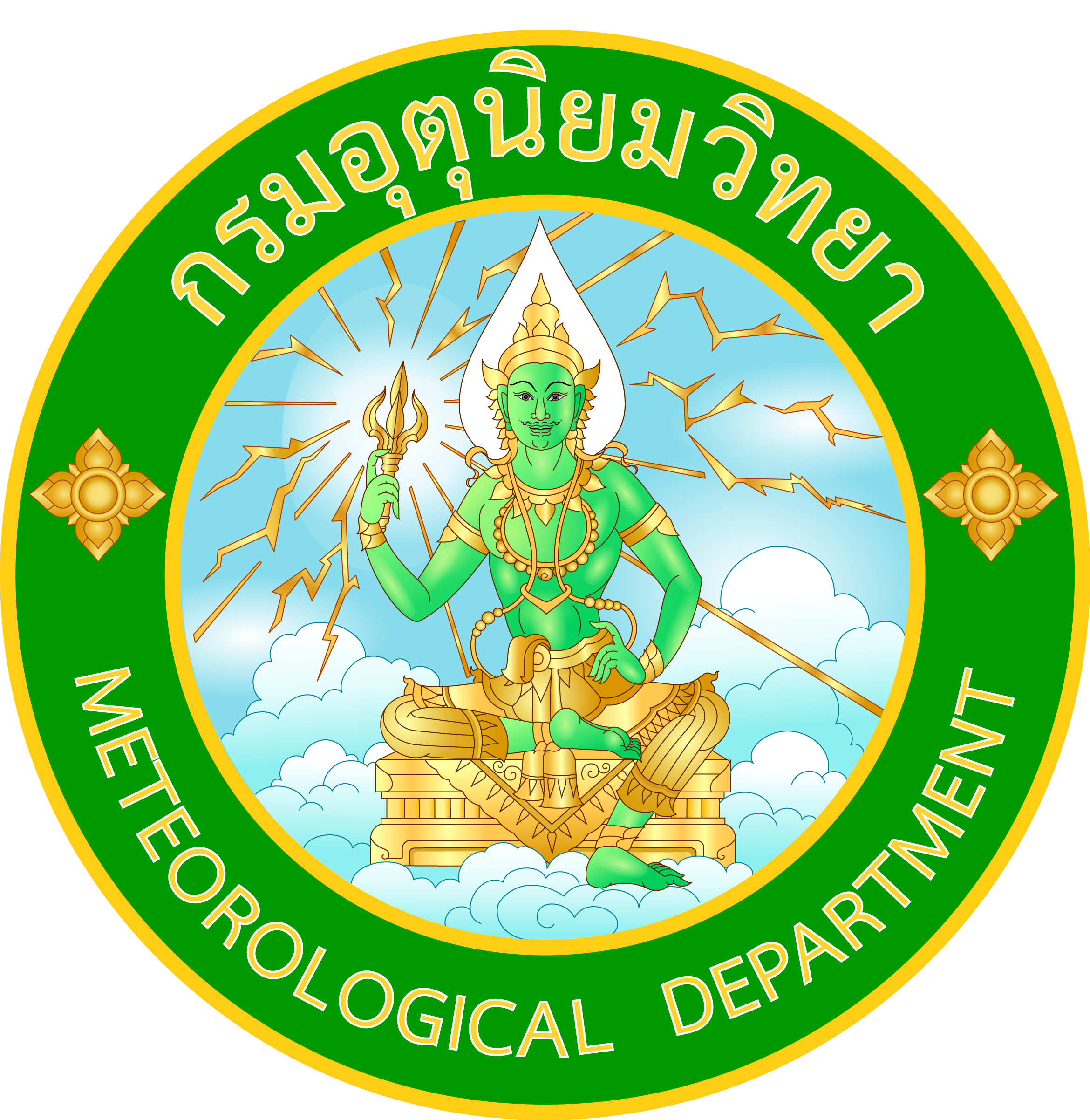
- Seal of Indra, God of Weather

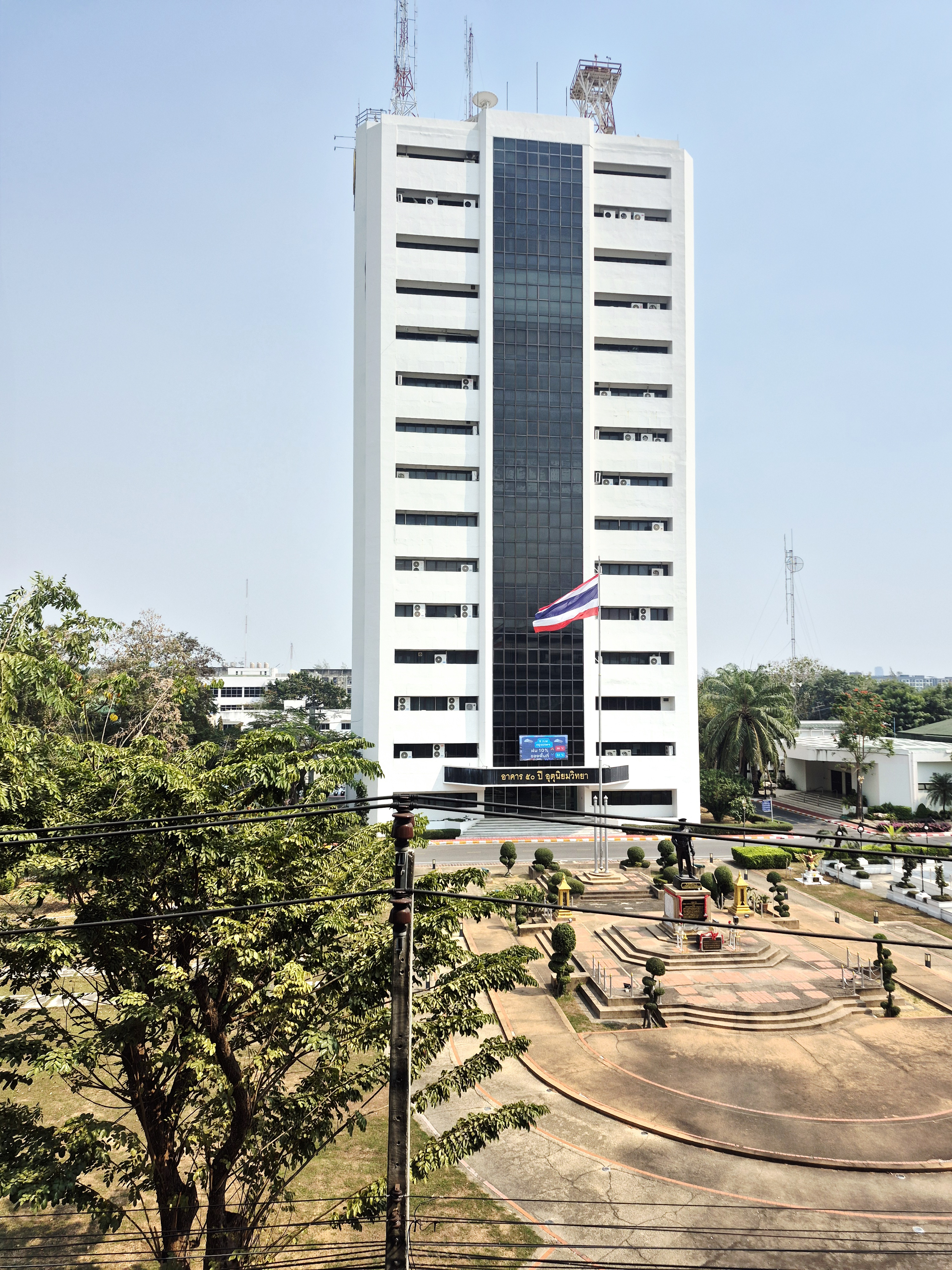
- Headquarter of Thai Meteorological Department

Agency overview
- Formed: 23 June 1942; 84 years ago
- Headquarters: Bangkok, Thailand
- Minister responsible: Chaichanok Chidchob, Minister of Digital Economy and Society
- Agency executive: Sugunyanee Yavinchan, Director-General
- Parent agency: Ministry of Digital Economy and Society
- Website: www.tmd.go.th

The Thai Meteorological Department (Abrv: TMD; Thai: กรมอุตุนิยมวิทยา, RTGS: Krom Utuniyom Witthaya) is the Thai governmental agency responsible for weather forecasting and monitoring. It is an agency of the Ministry of Digital Economy and Society (MDES). It maintains four meteorological centers: one each for the northern region, the northeastern region, and two in the southern region (eastern shore and western shore).

== History ==
In 1905 the science of meteorology was first introduced to Thailand by the Royal Thai Navy which included meteorology in its navigation course. Seven years later, in 1912, the first meteorological textbook in Thai was published.

Thailand’s first meteorological service, known as the Meteorological and Statistics Section, was established in 1923. It was attached to the Water Management Division of the Royal Irrigation Department under the Ministry of Lands and Agriculture. Observation stations were set up in provinces for the collection of meteorological data and for the construction of weir for flood control.

In August 1936 the Meteorological and Statistics Section was transferred to the Hydrographic Department of the Royal Thai Navy, where it was known as the Meteorological Division. The Meteorological Division was elevated to departmental status on 23 June 1942. In 1962, the department was transferred from the Royal Thai Navy to the Office of the Prime Minister.

The Meteorological Department was transferred from prime minister's office to the Ministry of Transport and Communications on 1 October 1972. On 3 October 2002, the Meteorological Department was moved to the Ministry of Information and Communication Technology (MICT) where it remains today (2016).

== International affiliations ==
Thailand joined the World Meteorological Organization (WMO) in 1949. It participates in several WMO programmes, most notably World Weather Watch (WWW) and the Tropical Cyclone Programme (TCP).

== See also ==
- List of Thai Meteorological Department weather stations in northeastern Thailand
- List of Thai Meteorological Department weather stations in northern Thailand
