= List of Thai Meteorological Department weather stations in northeastern Thailand =

Thai Meteorological Department (TMD) has a total of 118 weather stations throughout Thailand, including 21 Agromet stations.

== Weather stations in Thailand ==
Thailand is according to Thai Meteorological Department (TMD) for climatic observations divided into six regions: northern, northeastern, eastern, central, southern (west coast) and southern (east coast) Thailand.

== Northeastern region ==
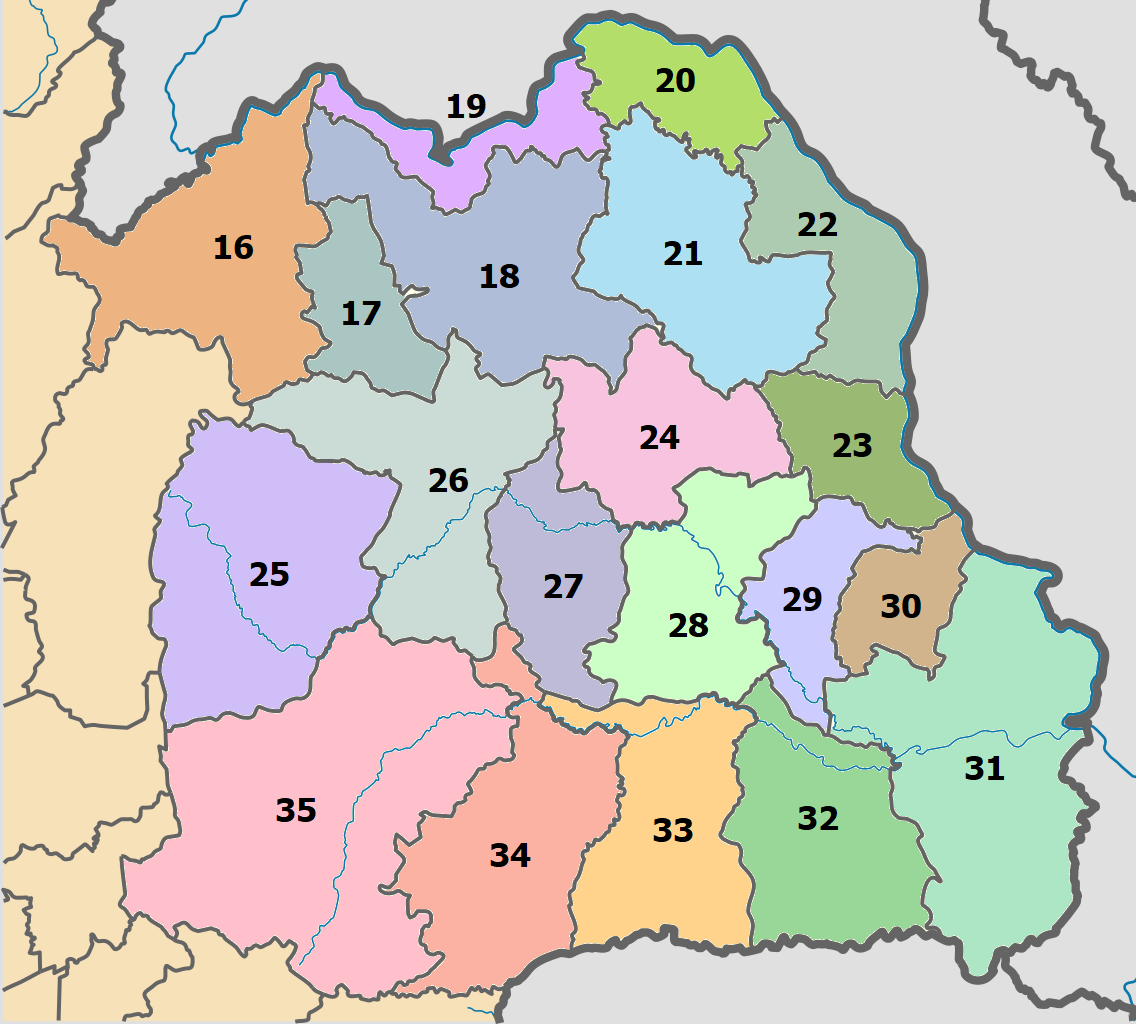
Northeastern region TMD

The northeastern region includes the 20 provinces:

16. Loei
17. Nong Bua Lam Phu
18. Udon Thani
19. Nong Khai
20. Bueng Kan
21. Sakon Nakhon
22. Nakhon Phanom
23. Mukdahan
24. Kalasin
25. Chaiyaphum
26. Khon Kaen
27. Maha Sarakham
28. Roi Et
29. Yasothon
30. Amnat charoen
31. Ubon Ratchathani
32. Sisaket
33. Surin
34. Buriram
35. Nakhon Ratchasima

=== TMD weather stations in northeastern Thailand ===
There are a total of 22 weather stations in northeastern Thailand, including 3 Agromet stations.

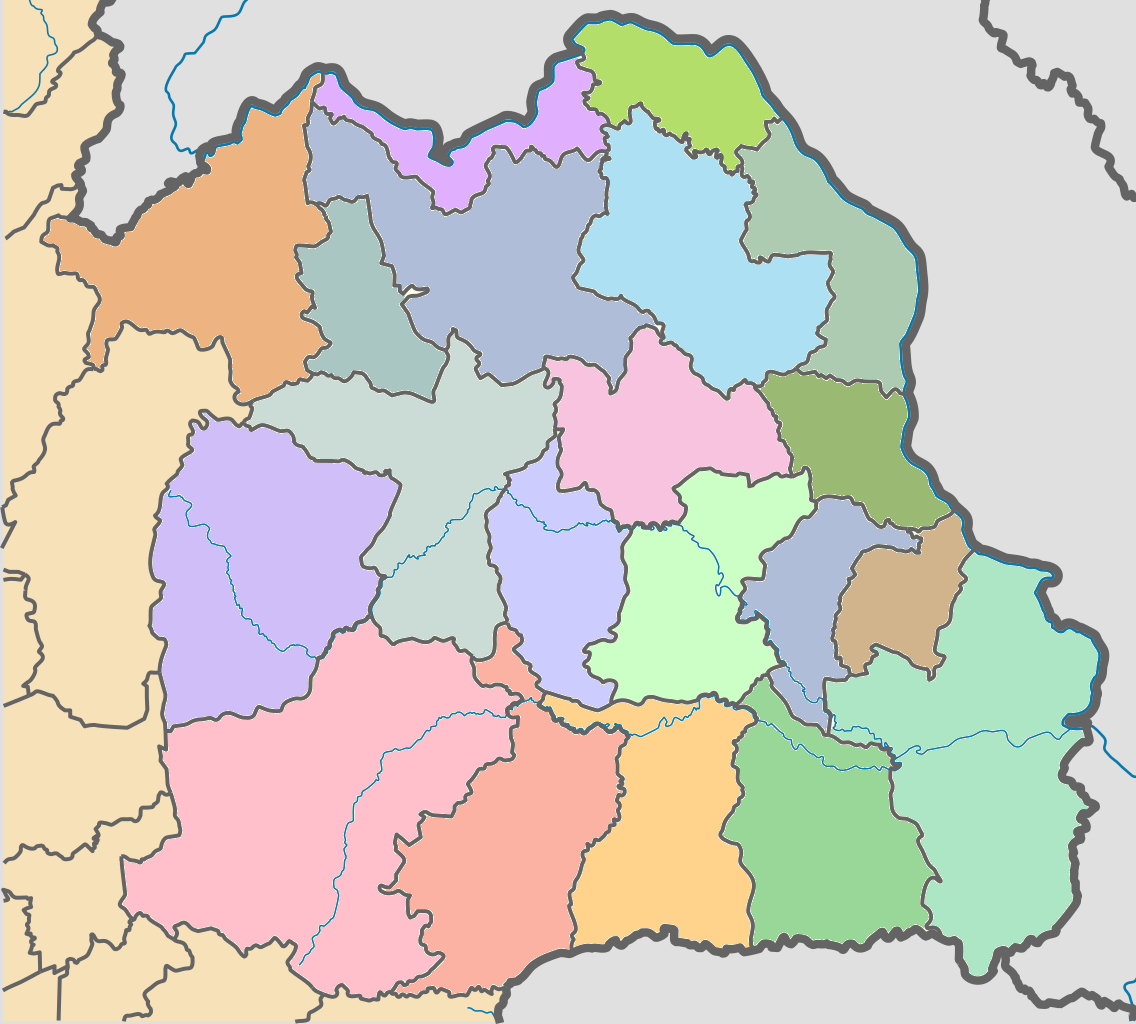
Northeastern Thailand with 22 weather stations

TMD weather stations in northeastern Thailand
Station name	#	Province	Station	North	East	Height	Height
Loei	30	Loei	48353	17.45°	101.73°	253 m	830 ft
Nong Bua Lamphu	31	Nong Bua Lamphu	48360	17.22°	102.42°	228 m	748 ft
Udon Thani	32	Udon Thani	48354	17.39°	102.79°	177 m	581 ft
Nong Khai	33	Nong Khai	48352	17.87°	102.75°	173 m	568 ft
Sakon Nakhon + WR	34	Sakon Nakhon	48356	17.15°	104.13°	171 m	561 ft
Nakhon Phanom	35	Nakhon Phanom	48357	17.42°	104.78°	140 m	459 ft
Mukdahan	36	Mukdahan	48383	16.53°	104.72°	138 m	453 ft
Kalasin	37	Kalasin	48390	16.32°	103.58°	139 m	456 ft
Chaiyaphum	38	Chaiyaphum	48403	15.80°	102.03°	182 m	597 ft
Khon Kaen + WR	39	Khon Kaen	48381	16.47°	102.78°	187 m	614 ft
Kosum Phisai	40	Maha Sarakham	48382	16.25°	103.07°	153 m	502 ft
Roi Et	41	Roi Et	48405	16.05°	103.68°	140m	459 ft
Ubon Ratchathani A.	42	Ubon Ratchathani	48408	15.38°	105.05°	131 m	430 ft
Ubon Ratchathani + WR	43	Ubon Ratchathani	48407	15.25°	104.87°	122 m	400 ft
Sisaket A.	44	Sisaket	48409	15.03°	104.25°	127 m	417 ft
Tha Tum	45	Surin	48416	15.32°	103.68°	128 m	420 ft
Surin + WR	46	Surin	48432	14.88°	103.50°	145m	476 ft
Buriram	47	Buriram	48437	15.23°	103.25°	180 m	591 ft
Nang Rong	48	Buriram	48436	14.58°	102.80°	179 m	587 ft
Chok Chai	49	Nakhon Ratchasima	48434	14.72°	102.17°	190 m	623 ft
Nakhon Ratchasima	50	Nakhon Ratchasima	48431	14.97°	102.08°	187 m	614 ft
Pakchong A.	51	Nakhon Ratchasima	48435	14.63°	101.32°	388 m	1,272 ft

Height = Elevation weather station above Median Sea Level
A = Agromet WR = Weather Radar with radius of 120 km or 240 km

=== TMD weather stations ===
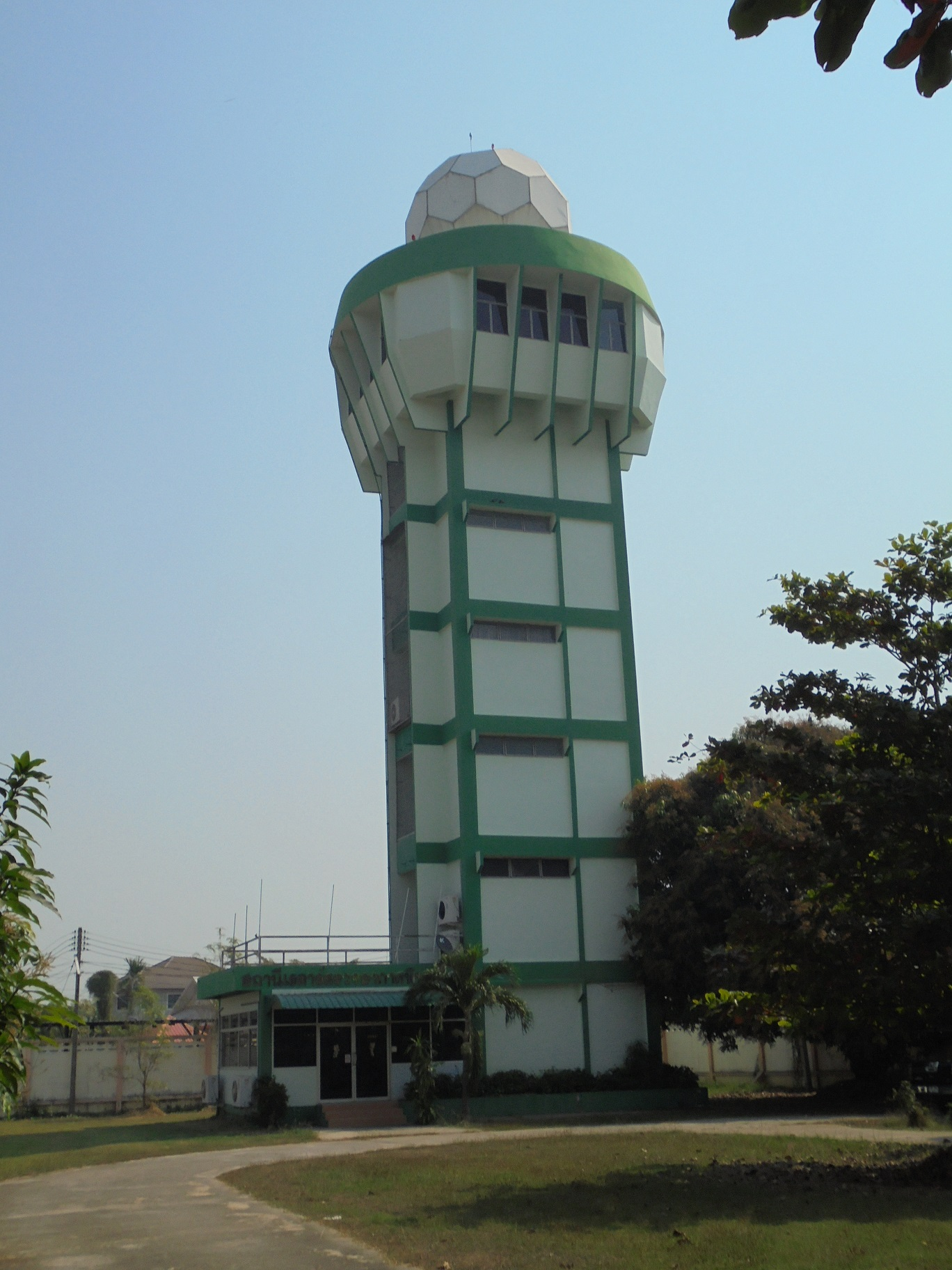
Station with weather radar

All TMD weather stations in Thailand have their own website. The weather forecasts are at 1.00, 4.00, 7.00, 10.00, 13.00, 16.00, 19.00 and 22.00 hour. The weather stations distribute the weather forecasts every day at 7.30, 8.30, 12.30,13.30,19.30 and 20.30 via FM radio broadcast, these include the weather forecasts of the neighboring weather stations.
When the weather station is located near an airport, the Royal Thai Air Force and civil aviation use their own weather station for the pilots' briefing.
In the northeastern region just four stations have a weather radar with a radius of 120 km or 240 km, they are station Sakon Nakhon, Khon Kaen, Ubon Ratchathani and Surin.

=== Agromet stations ===
Agromet stations deliver climatic data direct to TMD centers. Agromet stations distribute the weather forecasts every day at 1.00, 4.00, 7.00, 10.00, 13.00, 16.00, 19.00 and 22.00 hour via their own website.

Agromet station: a range of instruments

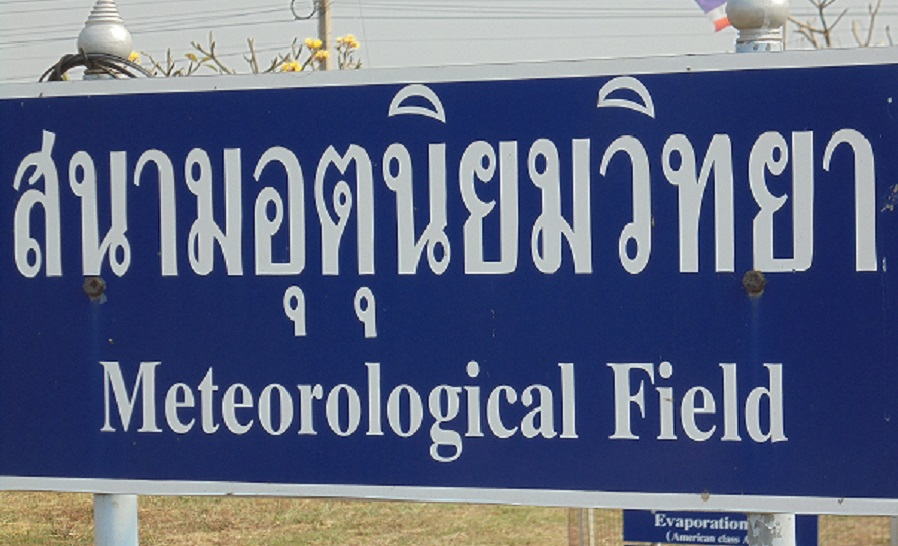

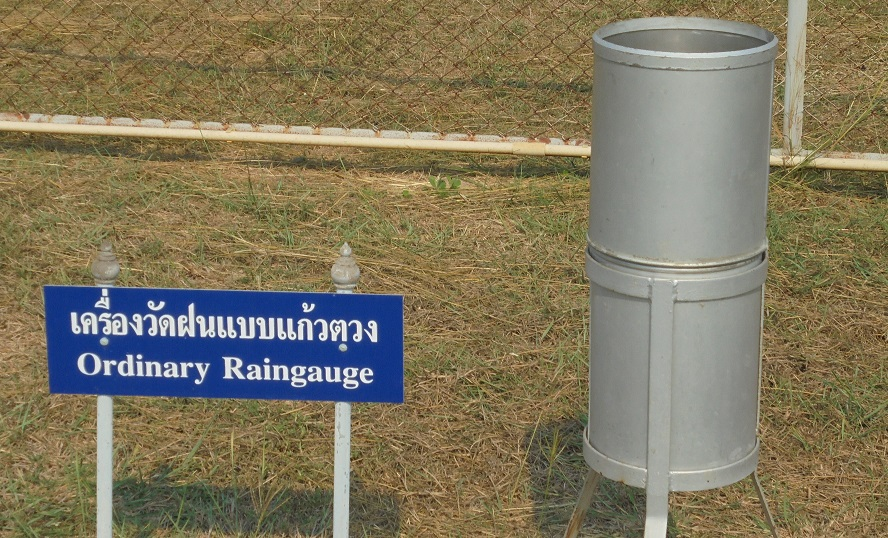

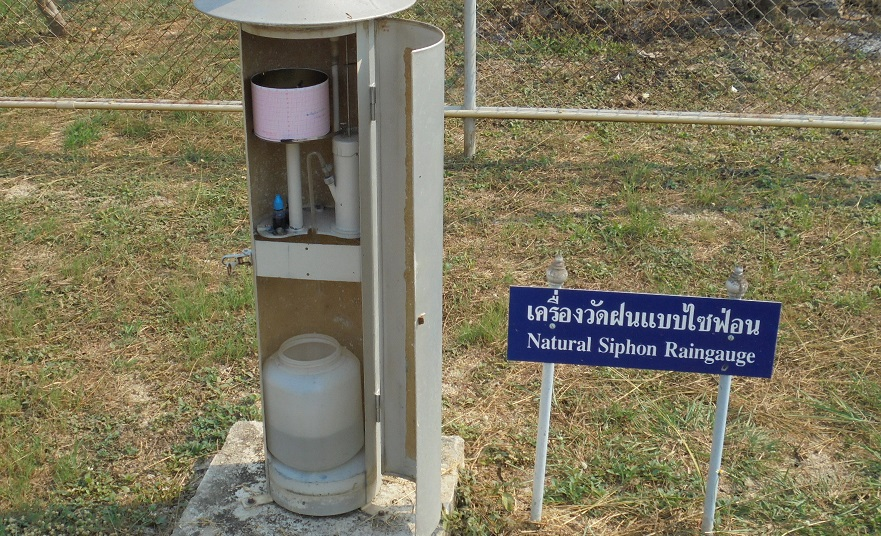

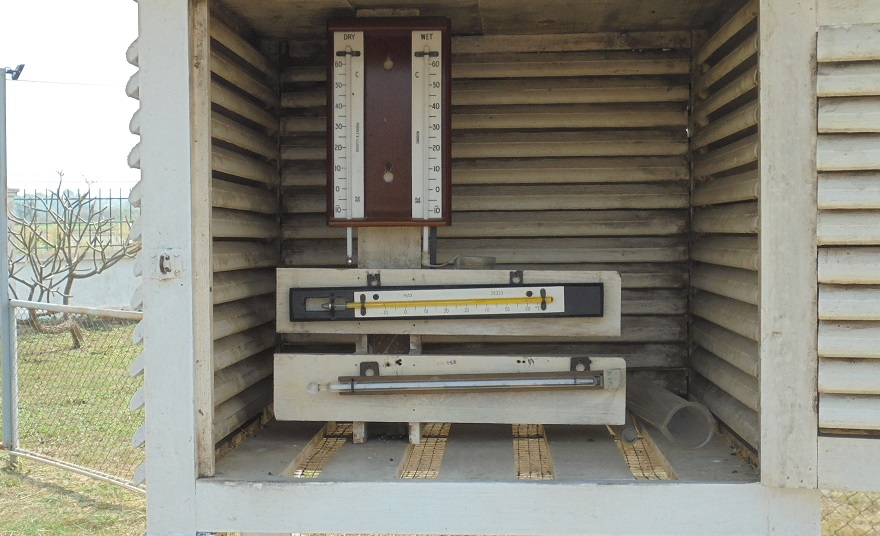

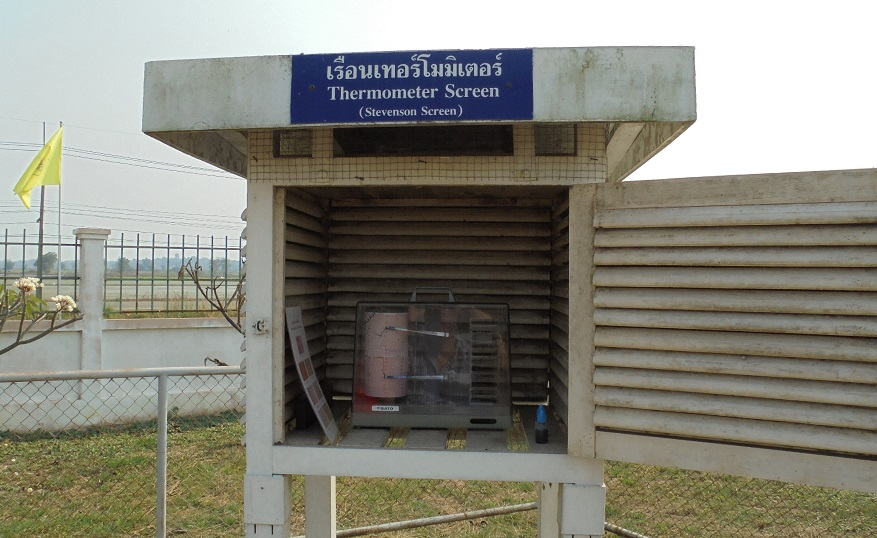

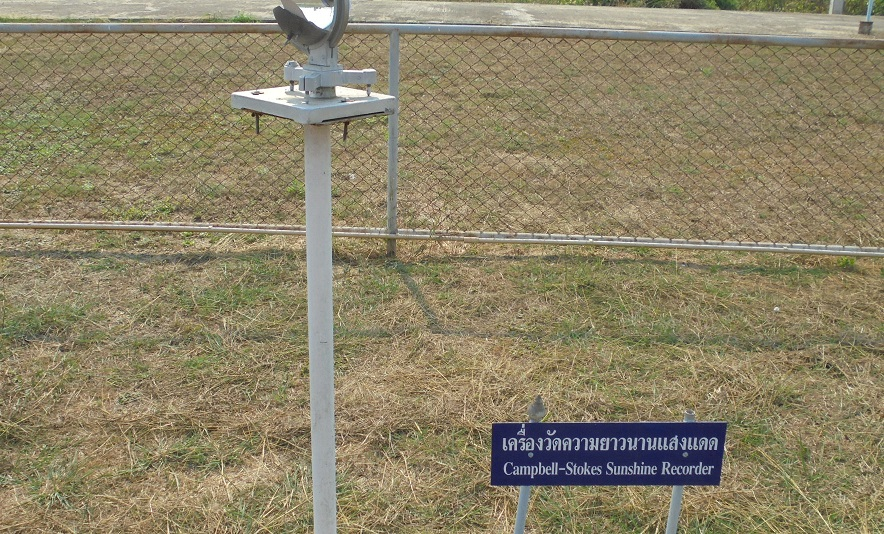

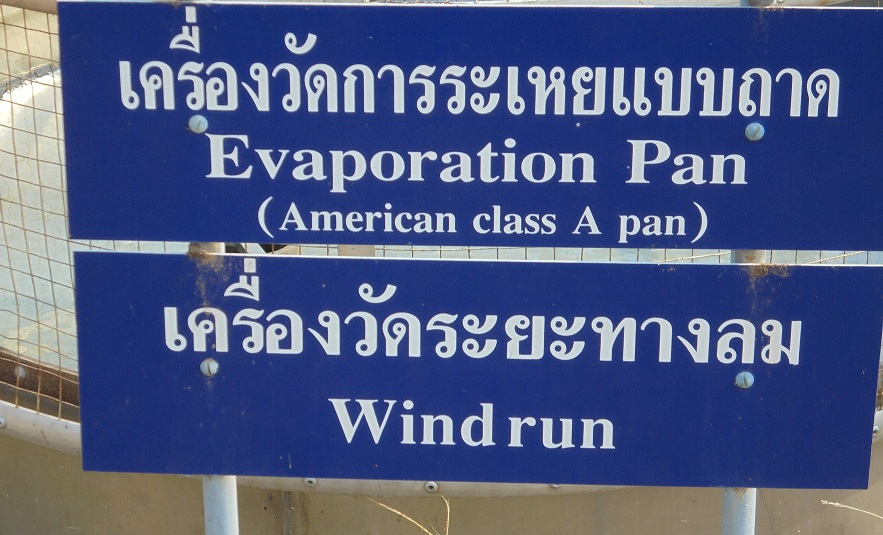

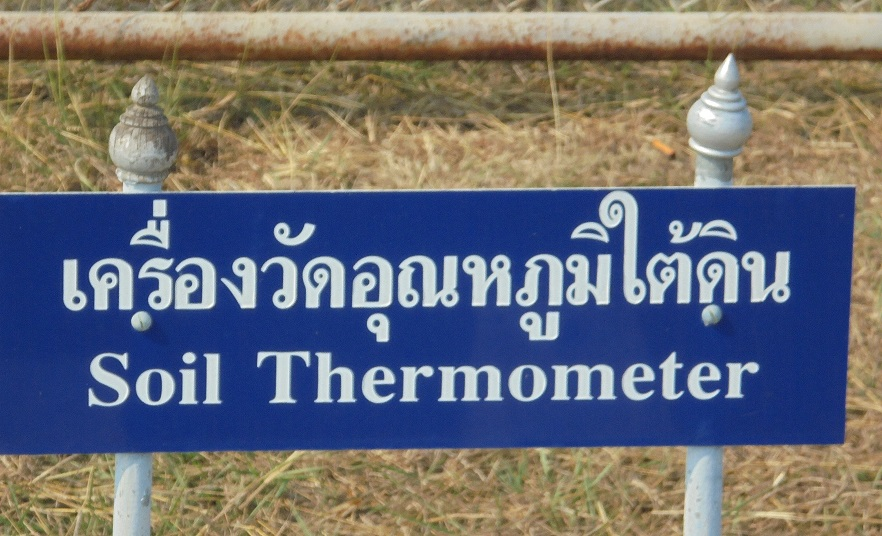

=== Weather forecasts northeastern Thailand ===
16. Loei.
17. Nong Bua Lamphu.
18. Udon Thani.
19. Nong Khai.
20. Sakon Nakhon.
21. Nakhon Phanom.
22. Mukdahan.
23. Kalasin.
24. Chaiyaphum.
25. Khon Kaen.
26. Kosum Phisai.
27. Roi Et.
28. Ubon Ratchathani and Ubon Ratchathani Agromet.
29. Sisaket Agromet.
30. Surin and Tha Tum.
31. Buriram and Nang Rong.
32. Nakhon Ratchasima, Chok Chai and Pakchong Agromet.

== Notes ==
- In this overview of weather stations, an Agromet station is omitted if it is located close to a TMD weather station.
