= Tropical cyclones in 2007 =

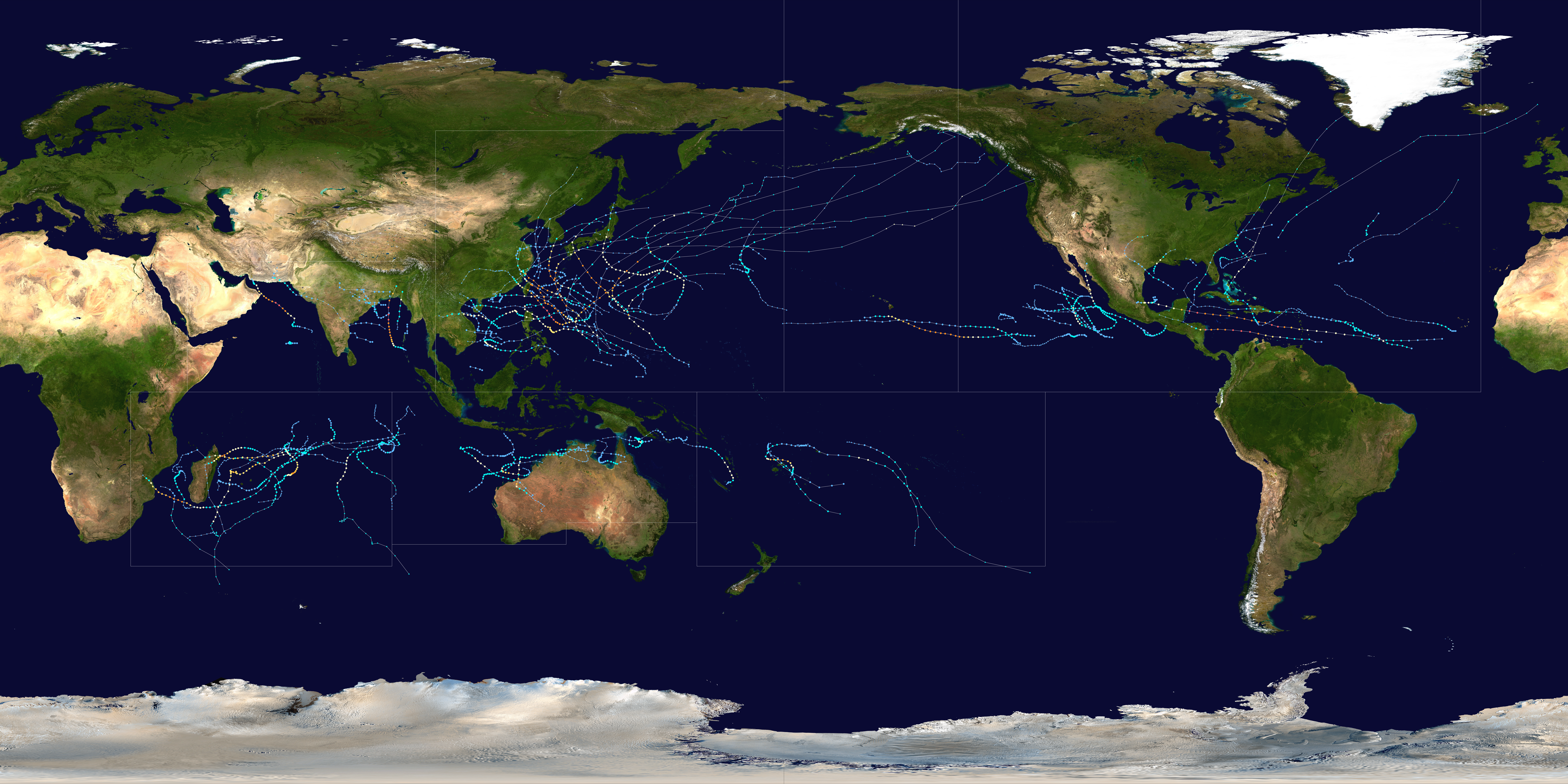
- Year summary map

Year boundaries
- First system: TD
- Formed: January 5, 2007
- Last system: Helen
- Dissipated: January 6, 2008

Strongest system
- Name: George (Note: The "strength" of a tropical cyclone is measured by the minimum barometric pressure, not wind speed. Most meteorological organizations rate the intensity of a storm by this figure, so the lower the minimum pressure of the storm, the more intense or "stronger" it is considered to be. The strongest winds were actually from Dean and Felix, at 175 mph (280 km/h).)
- Lowest pressure: 902 mbar (hPa); 26.64 inHg

Longest lasting system
- Name: Dora
- Duration: 13 days

Year statistics
- Total systems: 125
- Named systems: 79
- Total fatalities: 17,670 total
- Total damage: $20.05 billion (2007 USD)
Related articles
- 2007 Atlantic hurricane season
- 2007 Pacific hurricane season
- 2007 Pacific typhoon season
- 2007 North Indian Ocean cyclone season
- 2006–07 South-West Indian Ocean cyclone season
- 2007–08 South-West Indian Ocean cyclone season
- 2006–07 Australian region cyclone season
- 2007–08 Australian region cyclone season
- 2006–07 South Pacific cyclone season
- 2007–08 South Pacific cyclone season

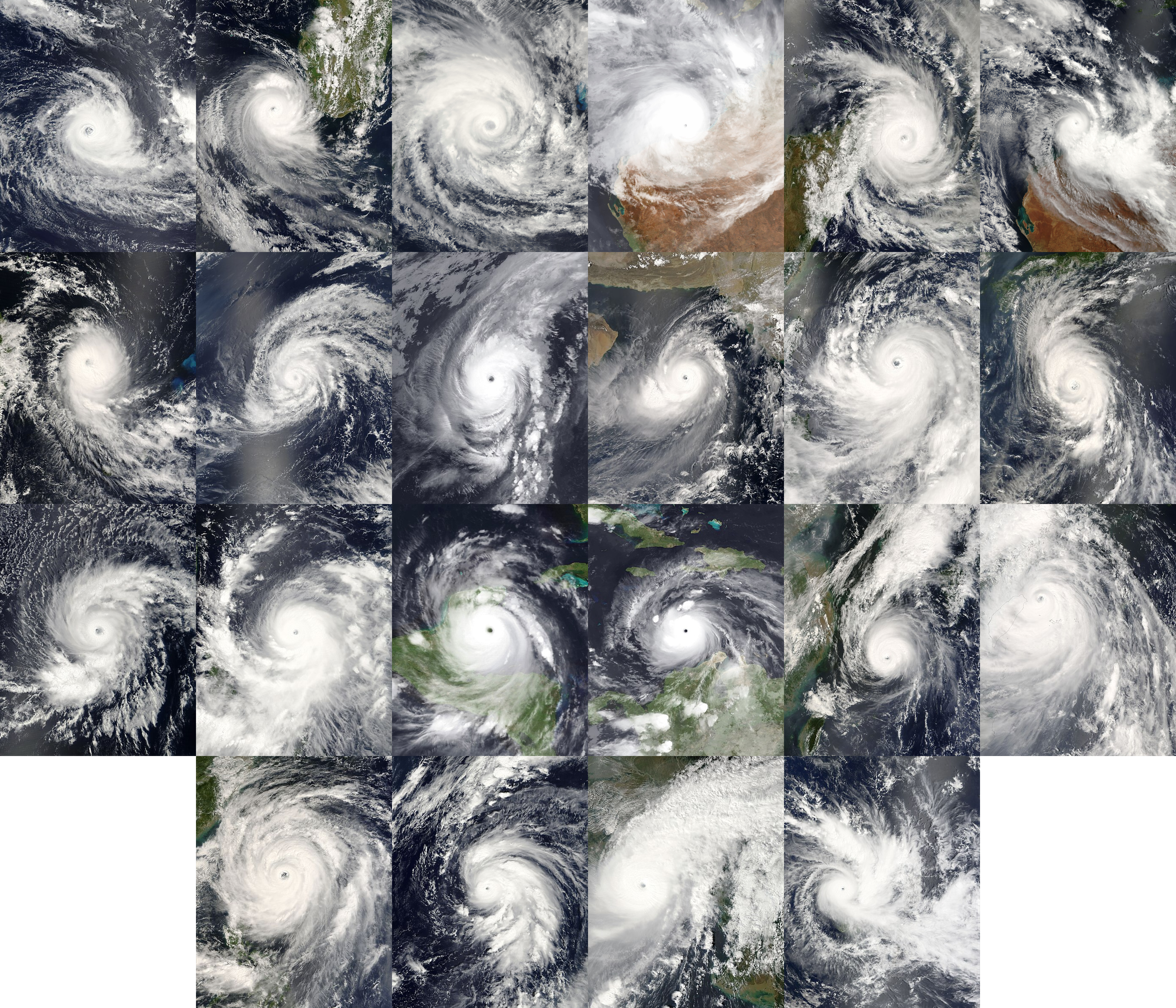
Satellite photos of the 22 tropical cyclones worldwide that reached at least Category 3 on the Saffir–Simpson scale during 2007, from Dora in January to Daman in December. Among them, George (fourth image in the first row) was the most intense, with a minimum central pressure of 902 hPa.

During 2007, tropical cyclones formed within seven different tropical cyclone basins, located within various parts of the Atlantic, Pacific and Indian Oceans. During the year, a total of 129 systems formed with 79 of these developing further and were named by the responsible warning centre. The strongest tropical cyclone of the year was Cyclone George, which was estimated to have a minimum barometric pressure of 902 hPa (26.64 inHg), which was also the last Australian Region cyclone to be the most intense within a year to date. The deadliest tropical cyclone of the year was Cyclone Sidr in the North Indian Ocean which killed 15,000 people in Bangladesh. The costliest tropical cyclone of the year was Cyclone Gonu in the North Indian Ocean, which caused more than $4.41 billion in damage after striking Oman, United Arab Emirates, Iran and Pakistan. The most active basin in the year was the Western Pacific, which documented 24 named systems. The North Atlantic had an above-average season with 15 named storms. The Eastern Pacific hurricane season experienced a below-average number of tropical storm intensity systems, numbering 11. Activity across the Southern Hemisphere's three basins – South-West Indian, Australian, and South Pacific – was fairly significant, with the regions recording 25 named storms altogether, with the most intense storm of the year coming from the Australian basin. Throughout 2007, twenty one major tropical cyclones formed, including five Category 5 tropical cyclones in the year. The accumulated cyclone energy (ACE) index for the 2007 (seven basins combined), as calculated by Colorado State University was 568.1 units.

== Global atmospheric and hydrological conditions ==
The ENSO during this year is mostly neutral, unlike the previous season.

== Summary ==
=== North Atlantic Ocean ===
The activity was a slightly above-average Atlantic hurricane season, featuring many weak and short-lived storms. Despite the high activity of weak storms during 2007, it was the first season to feature more than one Category 5 landfalling hurricane, a feat that would not be matched until ten years later. It produced 17 tropical cyclones, 15 tropical storms, six hurricanes, and two major hurricanes. The first system, Subtropical Storm Andrea, developed on May 9, while the last storm, Tropical Storm Olga, dissipated on December 13. The most intense hurricane, Dean, is tied for the tenth-most-intense Atlantic hurricane ever recorded as well as the fifth most intense Atlantic hurricane at landfall. The season was one of only seven on record for the Atlantic with more than one Category 5 hurricane. It was the second on record in which an Atlantic hurricane, Felix, and an eastern Pacific hurricane, Henriette, made landfall on the same day. September had a record-tying eight storms, although the strengths and durations of most of the storms were low. Aside from hurricanes Dean and Felix, none of the storms in the season exceeded Category 1 intensity.

Several storms made landfall or directly affected land. Hurricanes Dean and Felix made landfall at Category 5 intensity, causing severe damage in parts of Mexico and Central America, respectively. Both storm names, as well as Noel, the name of a hurricane that affected the Caribbean, were retired from the naming list of Atlantic hurricanes. The United States was affected by five cyclones, although the storms were generally weak; three tropical depressions and only two tropical storms, Barry and Gabrielle, and one hurricane, Humberto, made landfall in the country. Elsewhere, three storms directly affected Canada, although none severely. The combined storms killed at least 478 people and caused about $3.42 billion (2007 USD, $5.31 billion 2026 USD) in damage. (Note: The cumulative damage figures were obtained by summing the damage figures on the individual Tropical Cyclone Reports referenced throughout the article, with the exception of Hurricane Dean. Dean's damage figures were obtained by adding the per-country totals referenced in the Impact section of this article.)

=== Eastern Pacific Ocean ===
The activity was a below-average Pacific hurricane season, featuring one major hurricane. The first tropical cyclone of the season, Alvin, developed on May 27, while the final system of the year, Kiko, dissipated on October 23. Due to unusually strong wind shear, activity fell short of the long-term average, with a total of 11 named storms, 4 hurricanes, and 1 major hurricane. At the time, 2007 featured the second-lowest value of the Accumulated cyclone energy (ACE) index since reliable records began in 1971. Two tropical cyclones – Cosme and Flossie – crossed into the central Pacific basin during the year, activity below the average of 4 to 5 systems. Impact during the season was relatively minimal. In early June, Tropical Storm Barbara moved ashore just northwest of the Mexico–Guatemala border, causing $55 million (2007 USD) (Note: All damage totals are in 2007 USD unless otherwise stated.) in damage and 4 deaths. In late July, Cosme passed south of the island of Hawaii as a weakening tropical depression; light rain and increased surf resulted. A few days later, Dalila passed offshore the coastline of southwestern Mexico, killing 11 and causing minimal damage. Hurricane Flossie followed a similar track to Cosme in mid-August, producing gusty winds and light precipitation in Hawaii. Hurricane Henriette in early September produced torrential rainfall in southwestern Mexico, killing 6 and causing $25 million in damage. Baja California received moderate rains from Hurricane Ivo in mid-September, though no damage nor fatalities were reported. In mid-October, Tropical Storm Kiko passed just offshore the coastline of southwestern Mexico. Though no deaths were reported on the Mexico mainland, the storm capsized a ship with 30 people on board, 15 of whom were recovered dead, and 9 of whom were reported missing. Overall, the season ended with $80 million in damage and 49 deaths.

=== North Indian Ocean ===
The activity was an active year for this basin; it was the most destructive season in known history at this time, only for the 2008 season to surpass it the next year. 2007 was also the first season to have multiple Category 5 cyclones (by the Saffir–Simpson scale), and the two Category 5's, Sidr and Gonu, were also the first named Category 5 cyclones to form in their respective seas; Gonu in the Arabian Sea, and Sidr in the Bay of Bengal. Other notable storms of the season include Akash and Yemyin, both of which caused substantial damage and deaths. At least 4,545 deaths were reported, and damage was about 6.4 billion dollars.

== Systems ==
=== January ===
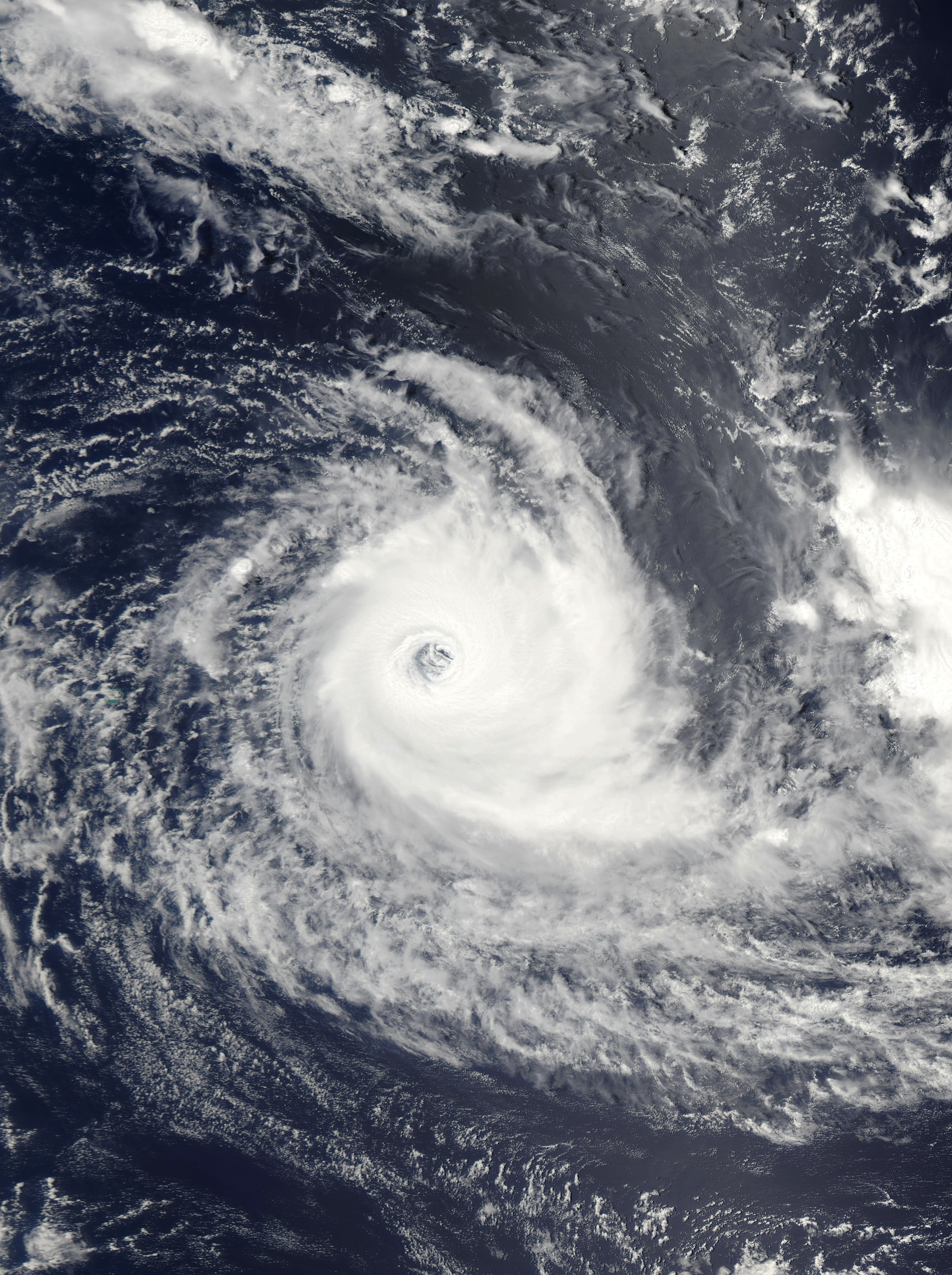
Cyclone Dora

In January, the Intertropical Convergence Zone (ITCZ), which allows for the formation of tropical waves, is located in the Southern Hemisphere, remaining there until May. This limits Northern Hemisphere cyclone formation to comparatively rare non-tropical sources. In addition, the month's climate is also an important factor. In the Southern Hemisphere basins, January, at the height of the austral summer, is the most active month by cumulative number of storms since records began. Of the four Northern Hemisphere basins, none is very active in January, as the month is during the winter, but the most active basin is the Western Pacific, which occasionally sees weak tropical storms form during the month.
In terms of activity, January was an inactive month, with six tropical cyclones forming, and three being named. In the southern pacific, cyclones Zita and Arthur impacted the Polynesian Islands. In the Southwest Indian Ocean, Cyclone Dora affected Rodrigues and became the strongest storm of the month.

Tropical cyclones formed in January 2007
Storm name	Dates active	Max wind km/h (mph)	Pressure (hPa)	Areas affected	Damage (USD)	Deaths	Refs
TD	January 5	Unspecified	1006	None	None	None	
06	January 5–8	45 (30)	999	None	None	None	
06F	January 9–17	55 (35)	1000	None	None	None	
Zita	January 18–25	100 (65)	975	French Polynesia	None	None	
Arthur	January 21–27	100 (65)	975	Samoan Islands, Cook Islands, French Polynesia	None	None	
Dora	January 26 – February 8	195 (120)	925	Rodrigues	None	None	

=== February ===
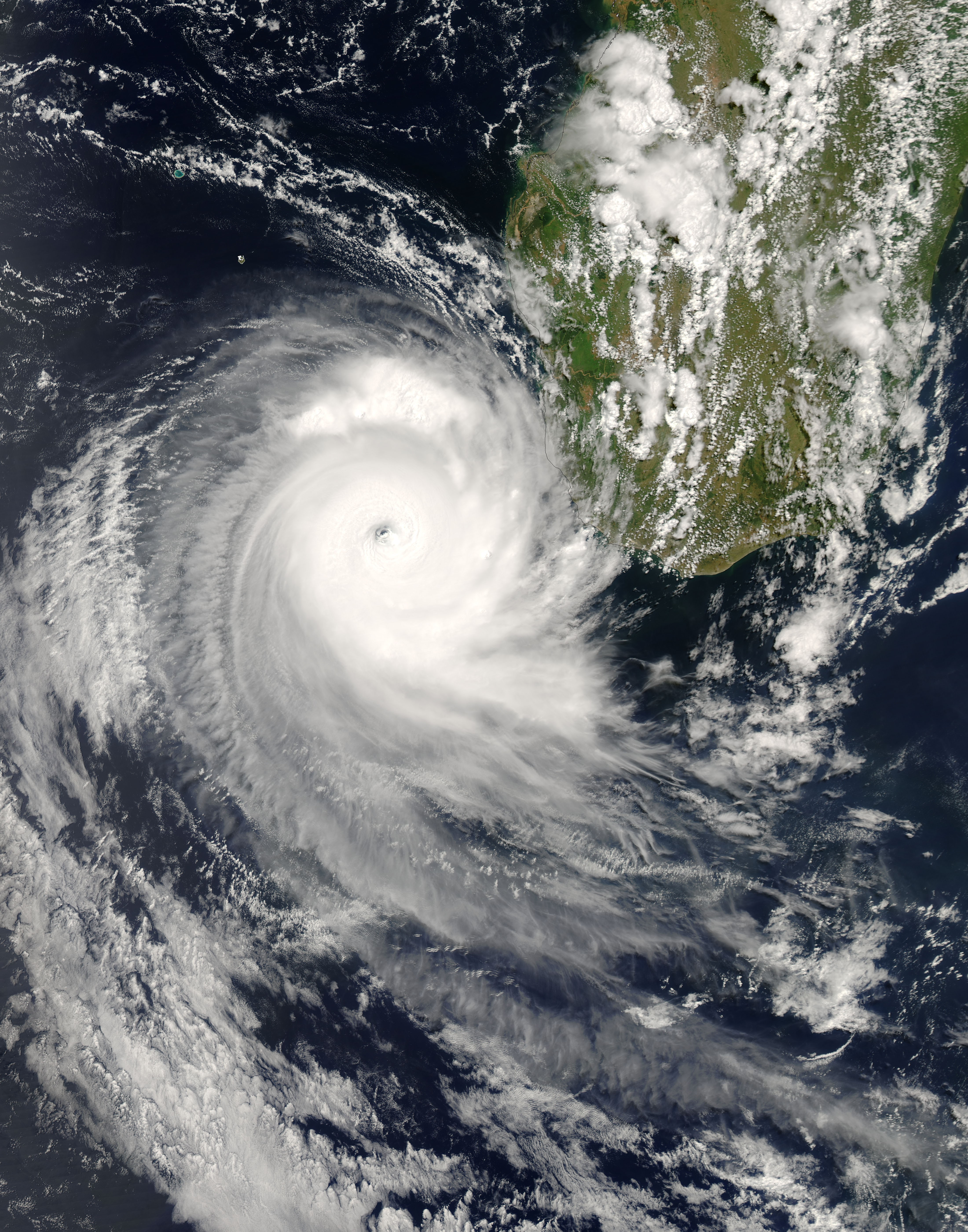
Cyclone Favio

In terms of activity, February is normally similar to January, with activity effectively restricted to the Southern Hemisphere excepting the rare Western Pacific storm. In fact, in the Southern Hemisphere, due to the monsoon being at its height, February tends to see more formation of strong tropical cyclones than January despite seeing marginally fewer overall storms. In the Northern Hemisphere, February is the least active month, with no Eastern or Central Pacific tropical cyclones and only one Atlantic tropical cyclone having ever formed in the month. Even in the Western Pacific, February activity is low: in 1992, the month had never seen a typhoon-strength storm, the first being Typhoon Higos in 2015.
February 2007 was an example of this phenomenon, although it was slightly more active, with seven storms forming, and five being named. In the Australian basin, Cyclone Nelson affected the Northern Territory area, albeit damage was mostly minimal. The Southwest Indian Ocean was the most active basin this month, with four named storms forming; Tropical Storm Enok, Cyclone Favio, Cyclone Gamede, and Cyclone Humba. Gamede was the second-wettest tropical cyclone on record, dumping over 5,500 mm of rain on Réunion.

Tropical cyclones formed in February 2007
Storm name	Dates active	Max wind km/h (mph)	Pressure (hPa)	Areas affected	Damage (USD)	Deaths	Refs
09F	February 1–5	Unspecified	997	Fiji	None	None	
Nelson	February 5–7	95 (60)	985	Southern Gulf of Carpentaria	Minimal	None	
TL	February 5–8	85 (50)	995	None	None	None	
Enok	February 6–13	110 (70)	978	None	None	None	
Favio	February 11–23	195 (120)	925	Mozambique, Madagascar	$71 million	10	
Gamede	February 20 – March 2	165 (105)	935	Mascarene Islands	$120 million	4	
Humba	February 20–26	140 (85)	960	None	None	None	

=== March ===
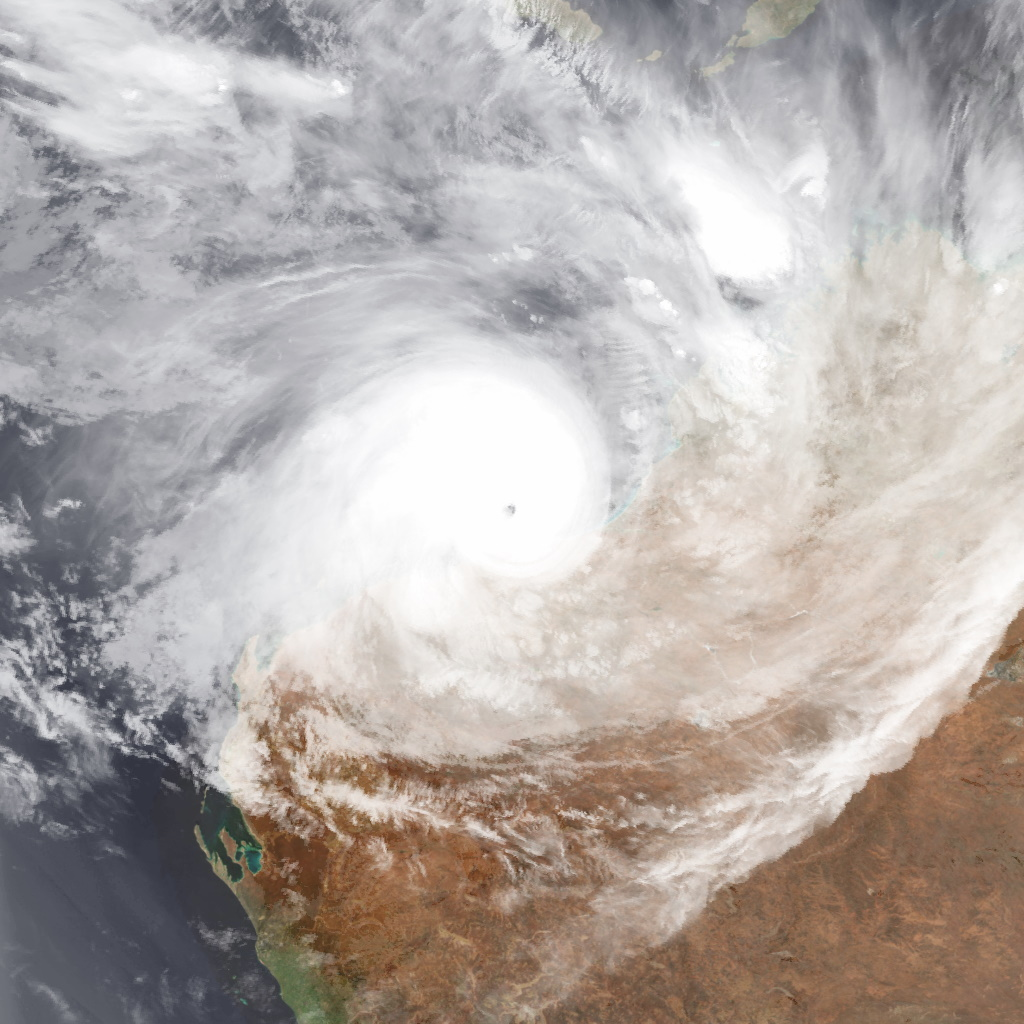
Cyclone George

During March, activity tends to be lower than in preceding months. In the Southern Hemisphere, the peak of the season has normally already passed, and the monsoon has begun to weaken, decreasing cyclonic activity, however, the month often sees more intense tropical cyclones than January or February. Meanwhile, in the Northern Hemisphere basins, sea surface temperatures are still far too low to normally support tropical cyclogenesis. The exception is the Western Pacific, which usually sees its first storm, often a weak depression, at some point between January and April.
However, March was a very active month despite this, with a total of eleven storms forming, eight being named. The Australian basin saw four named storms this month, with Cyclone George becoming the third-most intense tropical cyclone in the basin on record, only behind Cyclone Gwenda of 1999, and Cyclone Inigo of 2003. In the southern pacific, Cyclone Becky formed, and impacted New Caledonia. In the Southwest Indian Ocean, Cyclone Indlala and Cyclone Jaya formed, both impacting Madagascar. In the Northern Hemisphere, Typhoon Kong-rey formed and impacted the Mariana Islands.

Tropical cyclones formed in March 2007
Storm name	Dates active	Max wind km/h (mph)	Pressure (hPa)	Areas affected	Damage (USD)	Deaths	Refs
Odette	March 2–5	75 (45)	990	None	None	None	
George	March 3–10	205 (125)	902	Northern Territory, Western Australia	$15.7 million	5	
Jacob	March 3–12	130 (80)	958	Western Australia	None	None	
TD	March 6–7	Unspecified	1002	None	None	None	
Indlala	March 9–18	175 (110)	935	St. Brandon, Agaléga, Madagascar	$240 million	150	
13	March 13–17	45 (30)	1002	None	None	None	
12F	March 21–25	55 (35)	998	None	None	None	
Kara	March 23–30	155 (100)	948	None	None	None	
Becky	March 25–29	110 (70)	975	Solomon Islands, Vanuatu, New Caledonia	None	None	
Jaya	March 26 – April 8	185 (115)	935	Madagascar	Minimal	1	
Kong-rey	March 30 – April 6	150 (90)	960	Mariana Islands	$10 thousand	None	

=== April ===
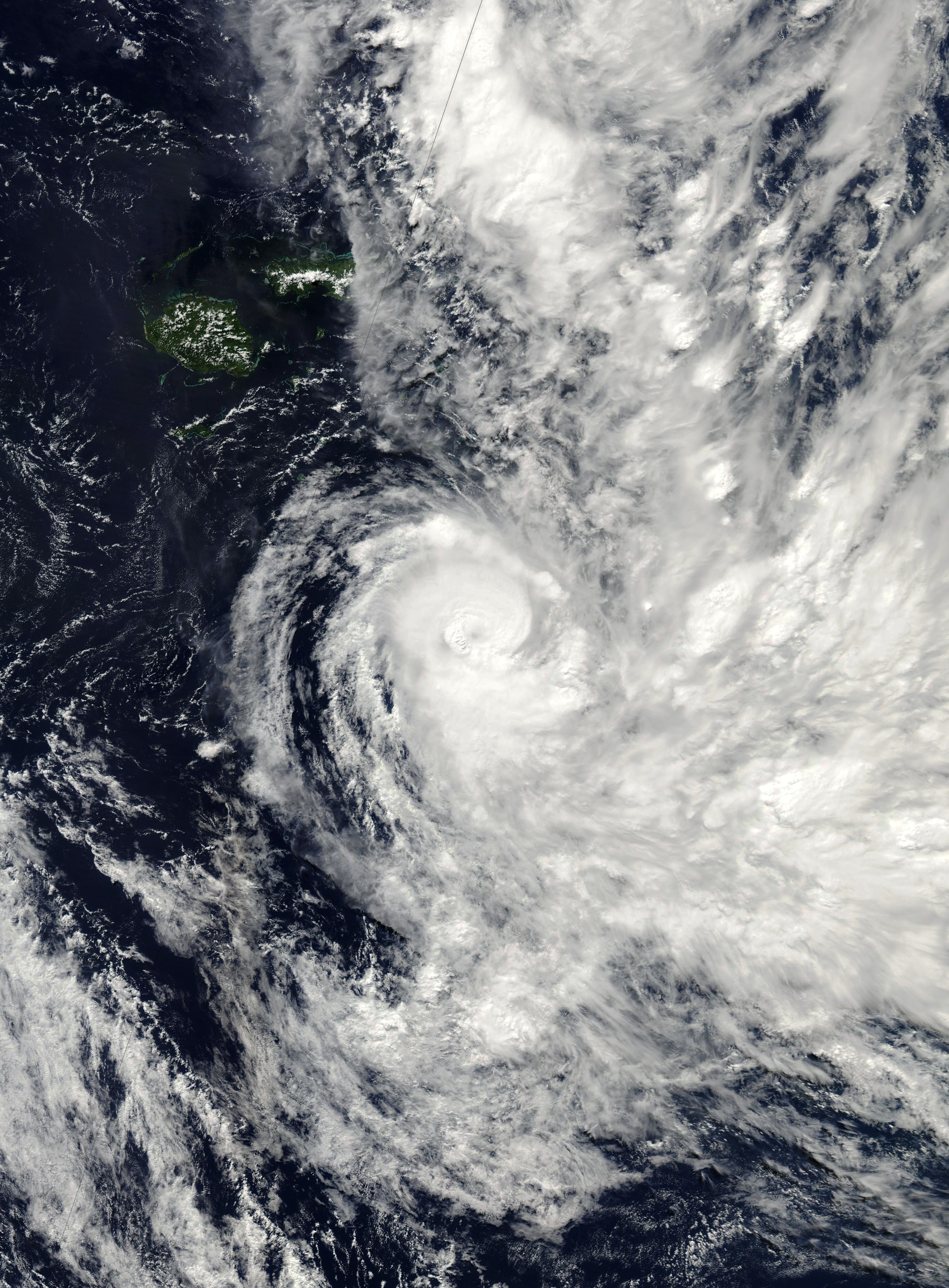
Cyclone Cliff

The factors that begin to inhibit Southern Hemisphere cyclone formation in March are even more pronounced in April, with the average number of storms formed being hardly half that of March. However, even this limited activity exceeds the activity in the Northern Hemisphere, which is rare, with the exception of the Western Pacific basin. All Pacific typhoon seasons between 1998 and 2016 saw activity between January and April, although many of these seasons saw only weak tropical depressions. By contrast, only two Atlantic hurricane seasons during those years saw tropical cyclone formation during that period. With the combination of the decreasing temperatures in the Southern Hemisphere and the still-low temperatures in the Northern Hemisphere, April and May tend to be the least active months worldwide for tropical cyclone formation.
Despite this, April 2007 was the second least active month in the recorded history of tropical cyclogenesis, only ahead of May 1992, with only two tropical cyclones, and only one, Cyclone Cliff, which impacted Fiji and Tonga, was named. Therefore, Cliff is also the strongest cyclone this month, both in terms of maximum sustained winds and minimum barometric pressure, and although Typhoon Kong-rey persisted into April, it was counted for the month of March, as that was the month it formed in.

Tropical cyclones formed in April 2007
Storm name	Dates active	Max wind km/h (mph)	Pressure (hPa)	Areas affected	Damage (USD)	Deaths	Refs
Cliff	April 1–6	100 (65)	980	Fiji, Tonga	$4.0 million	4	
15	April 9–12	95 (60)	994	None	None	None	

=== May ===
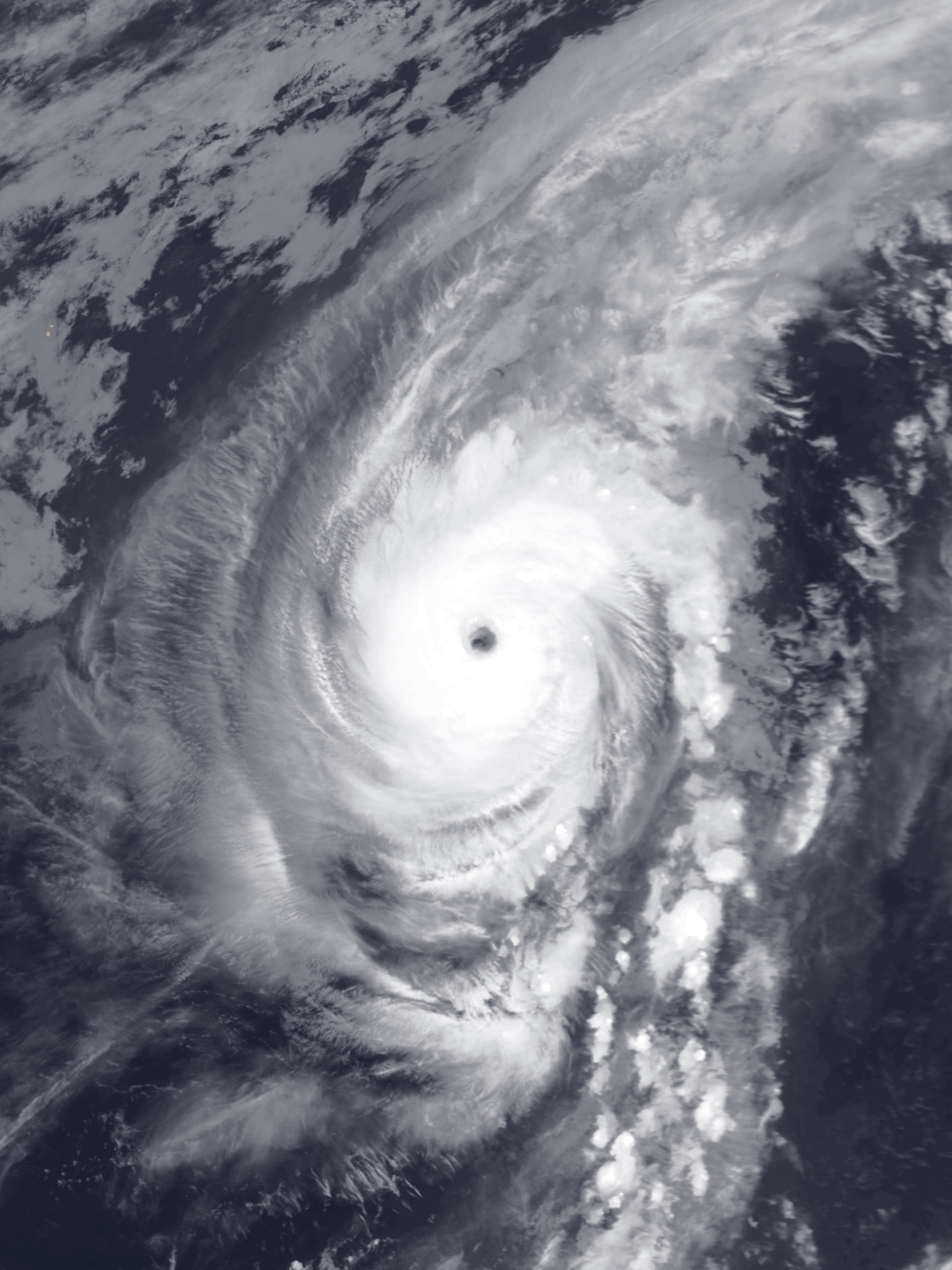
Typhoon Yutu

Around the middle of May, the Intertropical Convergence Zone (ITCZ), which allows for the formation of tropical waves and has previously remained in the Southern Hemisphere for the first five months of the year, moves to the Northern Hemisphere, allowing the northern cyclone seasons to start in earnest. Without the presence of the ITCZ, Southern Hemisphere cyclones must form from non-wave sources, which are rarer. For that reason, cyclone formation is relatively sparse, with May tending to be the month of the final storm in each of the three basins. Meanwhile, more intense storms are nearly unheard of, with the South-West Indian Ocean having seen only one intense tropical cyclone and no very intense tropical cyclones in the month, and the other two basins having similar levels of activity in May. In the Northern Hemisphere, May is the first month most basins see activity, due to the new presence of the ITCZ. The Pacific hurricane season begins on May 15, and although the Atlantic hurricane season officially begins on June 1, off-season storms are very common, with over half of the 21st century seasons seeing a storm form in May. Although the North Indian Ocean has no official start or end date, due to the monsoon, mid-May is the beginning of a month-long period of high activity in the basin. Even in the Western Pacific, activity tends to increase throughout May.
May was slightly active with seven storms forming, six being named. In the North Atlantic, Subtropical Storm Andrea caused minimal damage to the east coast of the United States, as well as the Bahamas. In the eastern and western pacific basins, Tropical Storm Alvin and Tropical Storm Barbara formed, with Barbara impacting Mexico, Guatemala, and El Salvador. Typhoon Yutu became the first super typhoon of 2007, as well as the strongest storm this month. In the northern Indian Ocean, Cyclonic Storm Akash caused widespread damage to the Andaman and Nicobar Islands, Bangladesh, and Myanmar. In the southern hemisphere, Cyclone Pierre caused minimal impact to Papua New Guinea.

Tropical cyclones formed in May 2007
Storm name	Dates active	Max wind km/h (mph)	Pressure (hPa)	Areas affected	Damage (USD)	Deaths	Refs
BOB 01	May 1–5	45 (30)	998	Thailand, Myanmar	$500,000	None	
Andrea	May 9–11	95 (60)	1001	Virginia, Southeastern U.S., Bahamas	Minimal	6	
Akash	May 12–15	85 (50)	982	Andaman Islands, Nicobar Islands, Bangladesh, Burma	$982 million	14	
Pierre	May 15–21	75 (45)	990	Papua New Guinea	Minimal	None	
Yutu (Amang)	May 17–23	175 (110)	935	None	None	None	
Alvin	May 27–31	65 (40)	1003	None	None	None	
Barbara	May 29 – June 2	85 (50)	1000	Southwestern Mexico, Guatemala, El Salvador	$55 million	4	

=== June ===
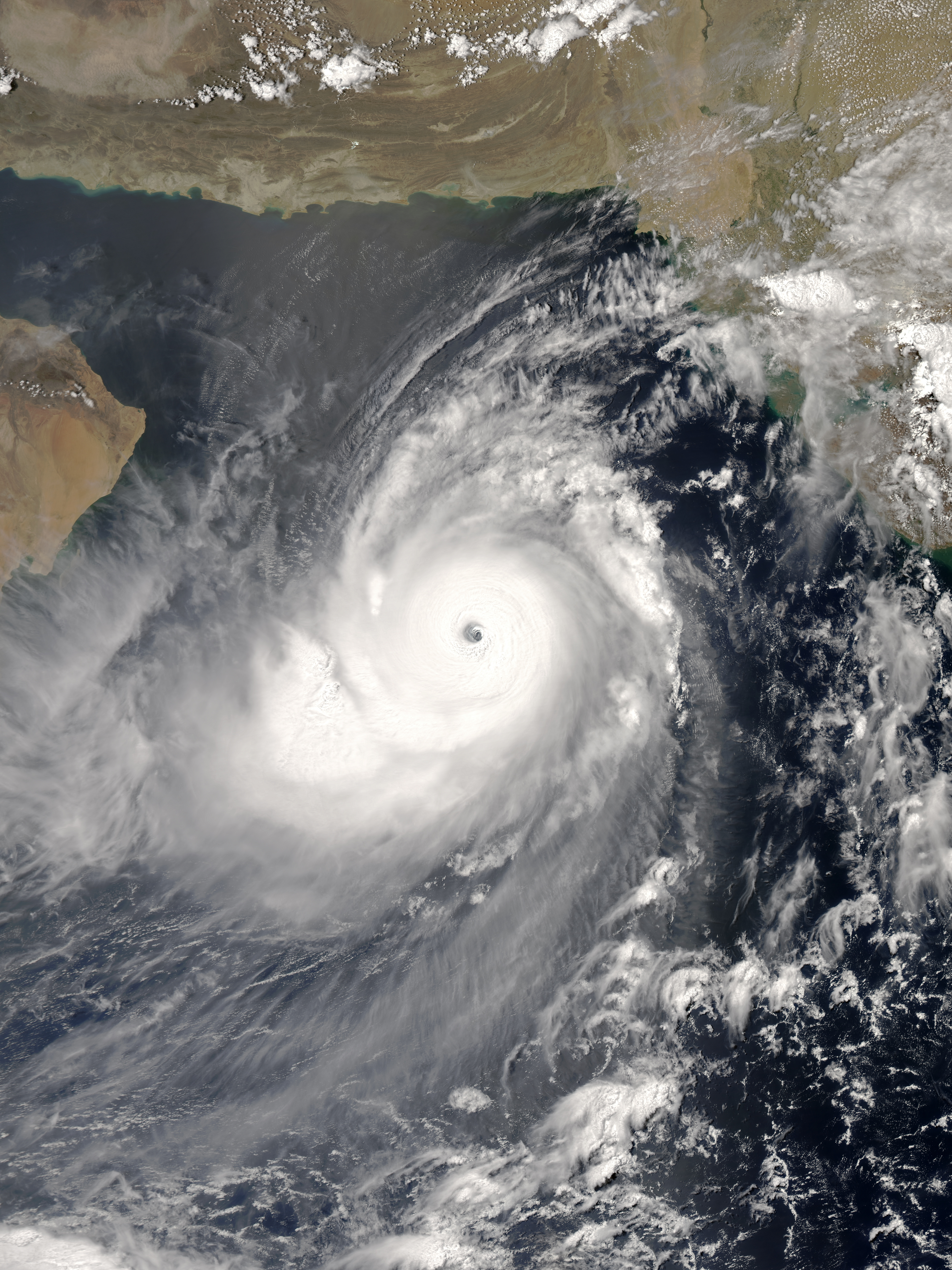
Cyclone Gonu

June was relatively inactive, with only six storms forming, three getting named. The month started with the formation of Tropical Storm Barry and Cyclone Gonu, both forming on June 1st, with the latter being one of the most intense cyclones on record in the North Indian ocean. Also in the North Indian ocean, Cyclone Yemyin and an unnamed depression formed as well, with Yemyin causing devastation and mass loss of life in Pakistan, India, and Afghanistan. In the Eastern and Western Pacific, an unnamed tropical depression, and Tropical Depression Three-E formed, with the former impacting the Caroline Islands.

Tropical cyclones formed in June 2007
Storm name	Dates active	Max wind km/h (mph)	Pressure (hPa)	Areas affected	Damage (USD)	Deaths	Refs
Barry	June 1–2	95 (60)	997	El Salvador, Cuba, Florida, East Coast of the United States	$118 thousand	3	
Gonu	June 1–7	240 (150)	920	Oman, United Arab Emirates, Iran, Pakistan	$4.4 billion	78	
Three-E	June 11–12	55 (35)	1004	None	None	None	
Yemyin	June 21–26	65 (40)	986	India, Pakistan, Afghanistan	$2.1 billion	983	
BOB 04	June 28–30	55 (35)	989	India	Unknown	57	
TD	June 29	Unspecified	1006	Caroline Islands	None	None	

=== July ===
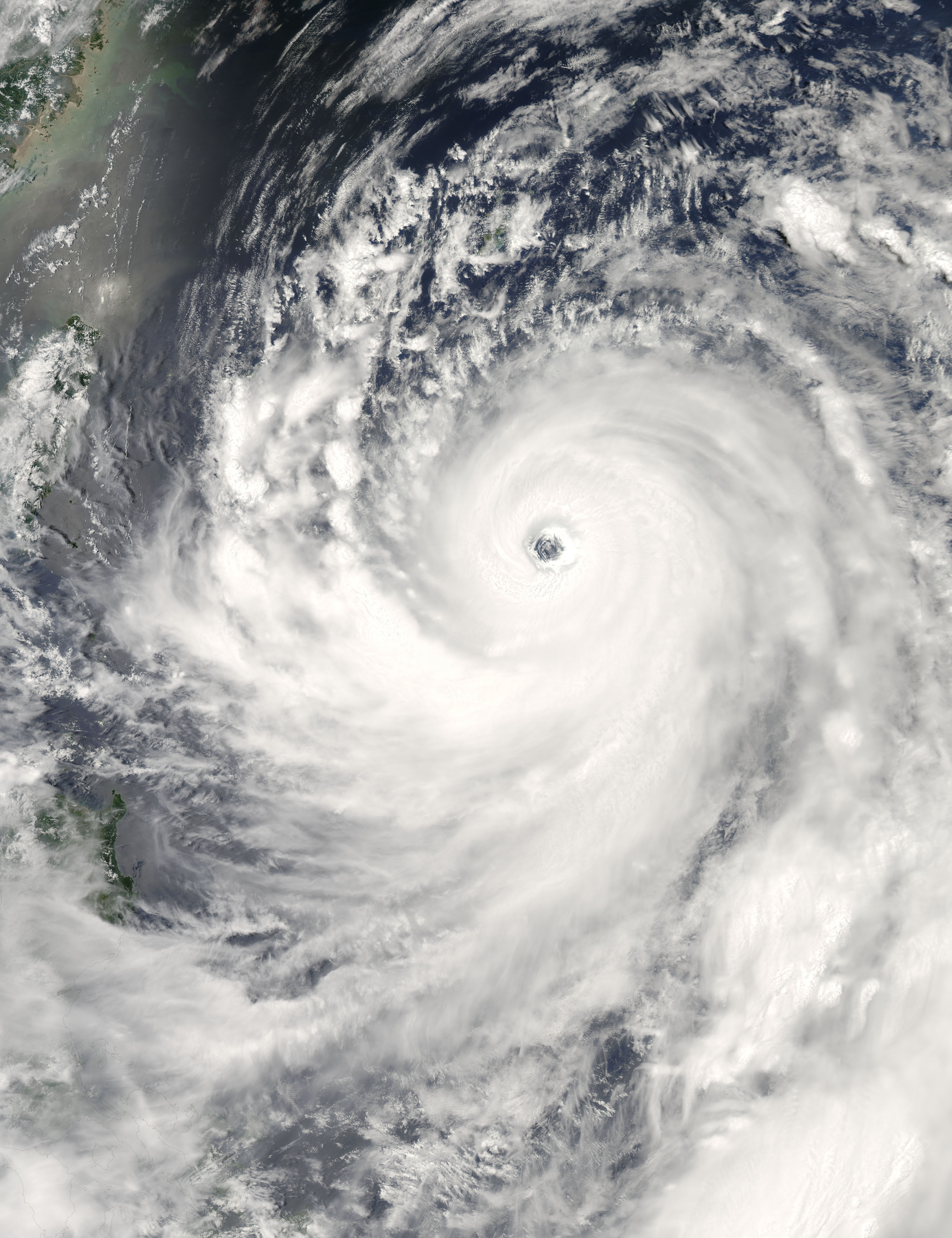
Typhoon Man-yi

Tropical cyclones formed in July 2007
Storm name	Dates active	Max wind km/h (mph)	Pressure (hPa)	Areas affected	Damage (USD)	Deaths	Refs
TD	July 2	Unspecified	1006	Caroline Islands	None	None	
Toraji	July 4–5	65 (40)	994	China, Vietnam	$9.7 million	None	
BOB 05	July 4–9	55 (35)	988	Bangladesh	Unknown	16	
Four-E	July 9–11	55 (35)	1006	None	None	None	
Man-yi (Bebeng)	July 9–16	175 (110)	935	Japan, Aleutian Islands	$105 thousand	16	
Five-E	July 14–15	55 (35)	1006	None	None	None	
Cosme	July 14–22	120 (75)	987	Hawaii	None	None	
Dalila	July 22–27	95 (60)	995	Baja California Sur, Jalisco, Socorro Island	Minimal	11	
01U	July 26–29	75 (45)	992	None	None	None	
Usagi	July 27 – August 4	165 (105)	945	Japan, Korean Peninsula, Russia	$225 million	None	
Erick	July 31 – August 2	65 (40)	1004	None	None	None	
Chantal	July 31 – August 2	85 (50)	994	Bermuda, Atlantic Canada, Newfoundland	$24.3 million	None	

=== August ===
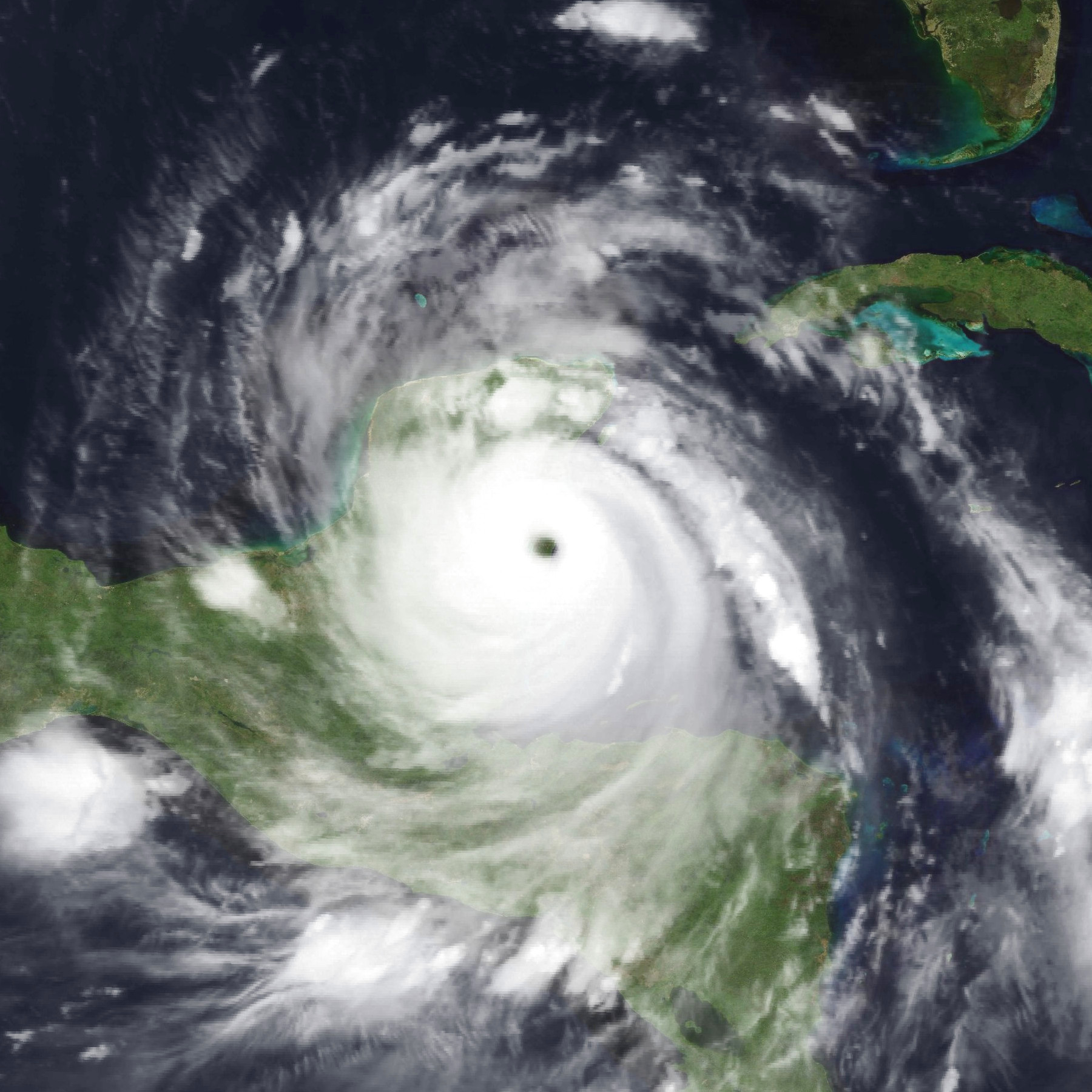
Hurricane Dean

Tropical cyclones formed in August 2007
Storm name	Dates active	Max wind km/h (mph)	Pressure (hPa)	Areas affected	Damage (USD)	Deaths	Refs
06W	August 2–8	55 (35)	994	China, Vietnam	$2.05 billion	77	
Pabuk (Chedeng)	August 4–14	120 (75)	975	Philippines, Taiwan, China, Korean Peninsula	$227 million	15	
BOB 06	August 5–7	55 (35)	984	India	Unknown	24	
Wutip (Dodong)	August 7–8	65 (40)	990	Philippines, Taiwan	Unknown	3	
Flossie	August 8–16	220 (140)	949	Hawaii	Minimal	None	
TD	August 10–12	Not specified	992	East China	None	None	
TD	August 11–12	Not specified	1006	None	None	None	
Sepat (Egay)	August 12–24	205 (125)	910	Philippines, Taiwan, China,	$693 million	46	
Dean	August 13–23	280 (175)	905	Lesser Antilles, Puerto Rico, Hispaniola, Jamaica, Cuba, Cayman Islands, Central America, Mexico	$1.6 billion	45	
TD	August 14–15	Not specified	1002	East China, Ryukyu Islands	None	None	
TD	August 14–17	Not specified	996	South China	None	None	
Erin	August 15–17	65 (40)	1003	Texas, Oklahoma, Central United States	$248 million	21	
TD	August 21–22	Not specified	1006	None	None	None	
TD	August 25–30	Not specified	1002	Taiwan, East China, Korea, Japan	None	None	
Fitow	August 27 – September 7	130 (80)	975	Japan, Russia	$1 billion	3	
Gil	August 29 – September 2	75 (45)	1001	Mexico	Minimal	1	
Henriette	August 30 – September 6	140 (85)	972	Mexico, Baja California Peninsula	$25 million	11	
Felix	August 31 – September 5	280 (175)	929	Trinidad and Tobago, Windward Islands, Venezuela, Leeward Islands, Colombia, Central America, Mexico	$720 million	133	
TD	August 31	Not specified	1016	None	None	None	

=== September ===
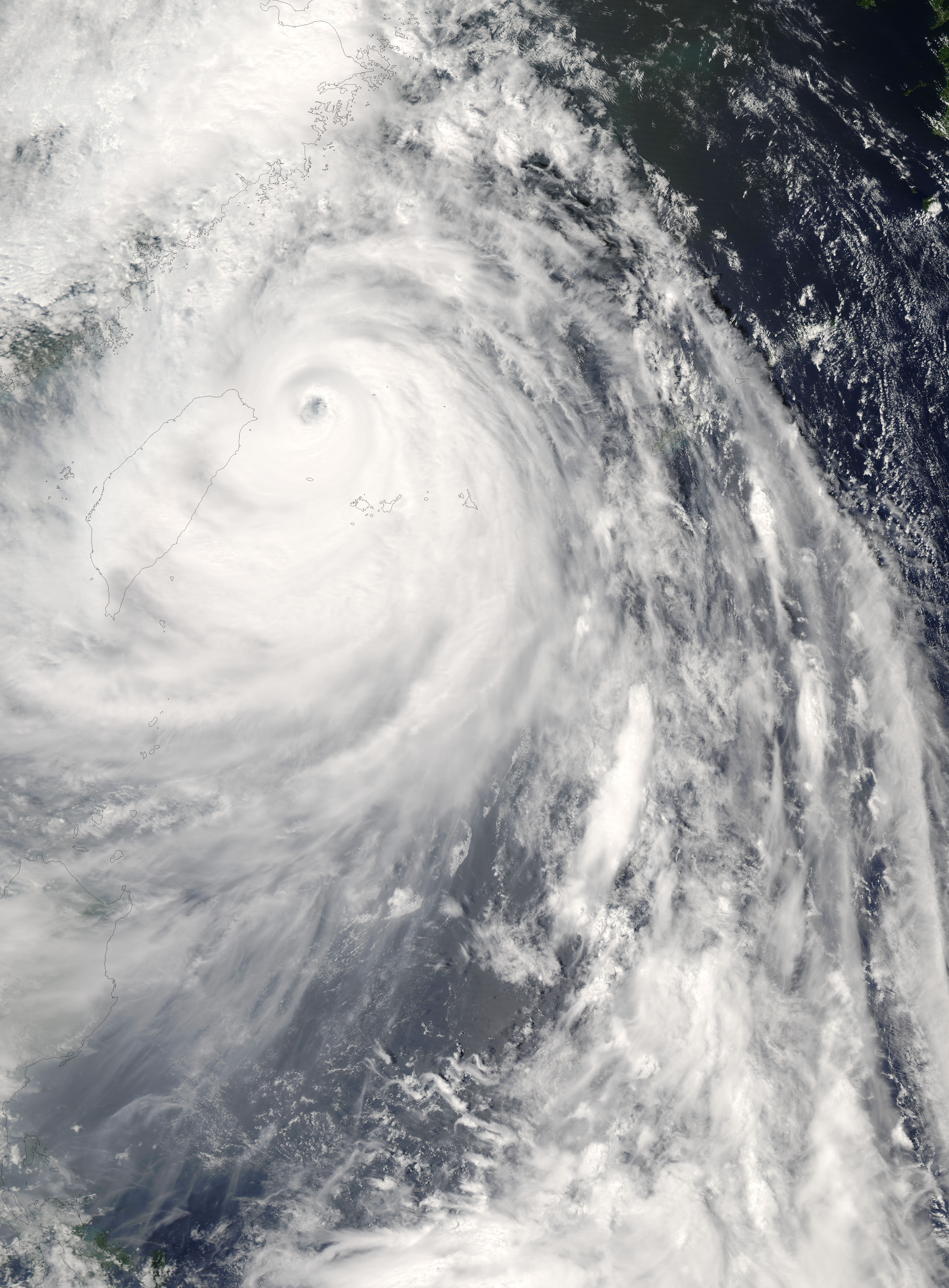
Typhoon Wipha

Tropical cyclones formed in September 2007
Storm name	Dates active	Max wind km/h (mph)	Pressure (hPa)	Areas affected	Damage (USD)	Deaths	Refs
Danas	September 6–11	100 (65)	990	None	None	None	
Gabrielle	September 8–11	95 (60)	1004	East Coast of the United States	Minimal	1	
TD	September 9–14	Not specified	1000	Ryukyu Islands, East China	None	None	
Nari (Falcon)	September 11–17	185 (115)	935	Japan, South Korea	$393 million	23	
Ingrid	September 12–17	75 (45)	1002	None	None	None	
Humberto	September 12–14	150 (90)	985	Texas, Louisiana, Mississippi, Carolinas	$50 million	1	
Wipha (Goring)	September 15–20	185 (115)	925	Taiwan, China	$1.3 billion	20	
Ivo	September 18–23	130 (80)	984	Baja California Peninsula	None	None	
Thirteen-E	September 19–20	55 (35)	1007	None	None	None	
14W	September 19–21	55 (35)	1004	None	None	None	
Ten	September 21–22	55 (35)	1005	Florida, Georgia, Alabama	$6.2 million	None	
Francisco	September 21–26	75 (45)	990	China, Vietnam, Laos, Thailand, Cambodia	Unknown	Unknown	
BOB 07	September 21–24	45 (30)	990	India	Unknown	75	
Jerry	September 23–24	65 (40)	1003	None	None	None	
TD	September 24–25	Not specified	1006	None	None	None	
Karen	September 25–29	120 (75)	988	None	None	None	
Lorenzo	September 25–28	130 (80)	990	Mexico	$92 million	6	
TD	September 27–28	Not specified	1002	None	None	None	
Lekima (Hanna)	September 28 – October 4	110 (70)	975	Philippines, Vietnam	$125 million	110	
Melissa	September 28–30	65 (40)	1005	None	None	None	
Juliette	September 29 – October 2	95 (60)	997	None	None	None	
Hayian	September 30 – October 7	75 (45)	994	None	None	None	

=== October ===
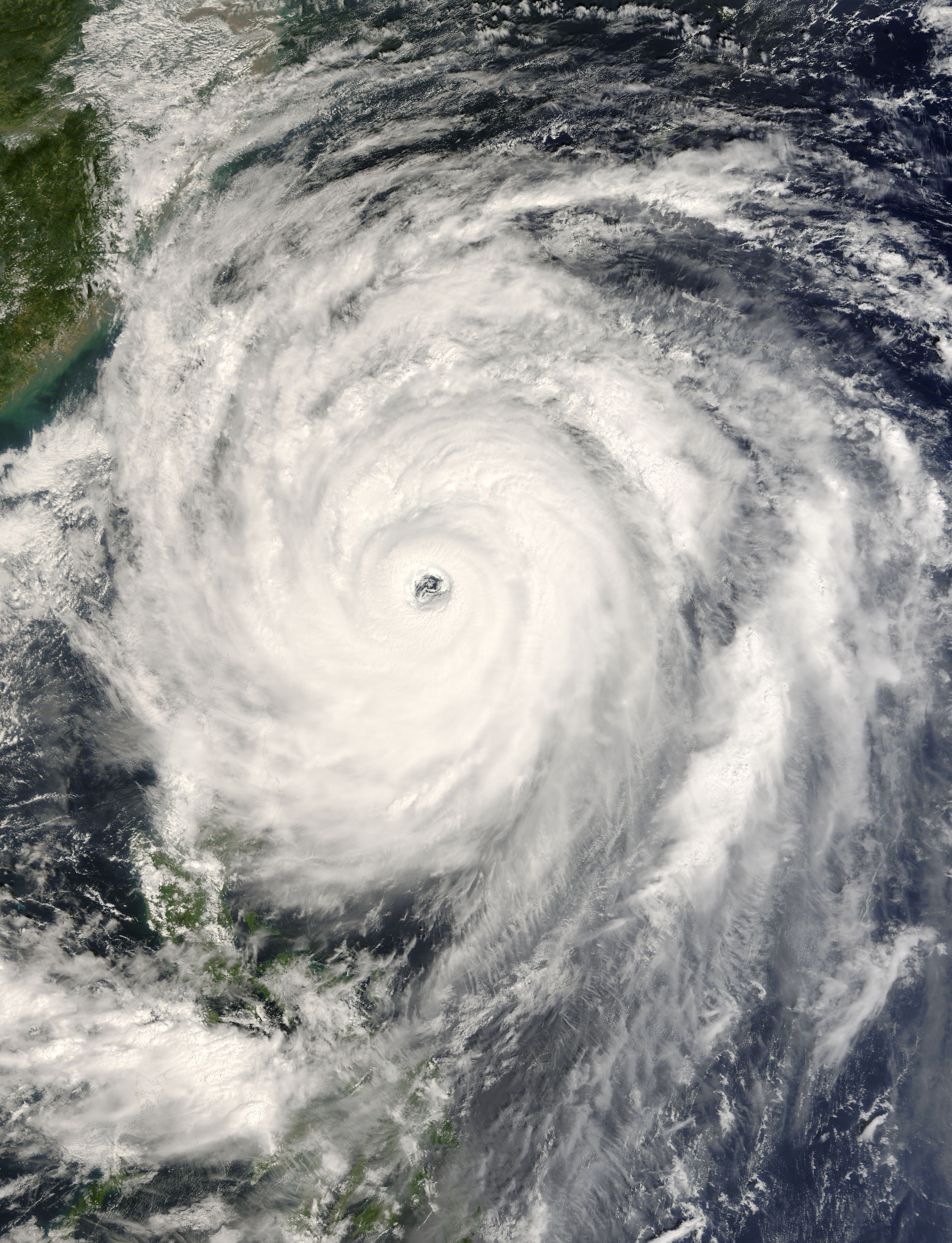
Typhoon Krosa

Tropical cyclones formed in October 2007
Storm name	Dates active	Max wind km/h (mph)	Pressure (hPa)	Areas affected	Damage (USD)	Deaths	Refs
Krosa (Ineng)	October 1–8	195 (120)	925	Taiwan, China	$1.7 billion	5	
Podul	October 6–7	100 (65)	985	None	None	None	
Lingling	October 10–15	80 (50)	994	None	None	None	
Fifteen	October 11–12	55 (35)	1011	None	None	None	
01	October 12–13	45 (30)	1005	None	None	None	
Kiko	October 15–23	110 (70)	991	Western Mexico	None	15	
01F	October 17–19	Unspecified	1000	Solomon Islands	None	None	
Kajiki	October 18–22	165 (105)	945	None	None	None	
Faxai (Juaning)	October 25–29	100 (65)	975	Japan	1	$1.5 million	
BOB 08	October 27–29	45 (30)	1004	India	Unknown	34	
ARB 02	October 27 – November 2	55 (35)	1000	Somalia	None	None	
Noel	October 28 – November 2	140 (80)	980	Leeward Islands, Puerto Rico, Hispaniola, Jamaica, Cuba, Turks and Caicos Islands, Bahamas, Florida, East Coast of the United States, Atlantic Canada, Greenland	$580 million	222	
TD	October 29–30	Unspecified	1004	None	None	None	

=== November ===
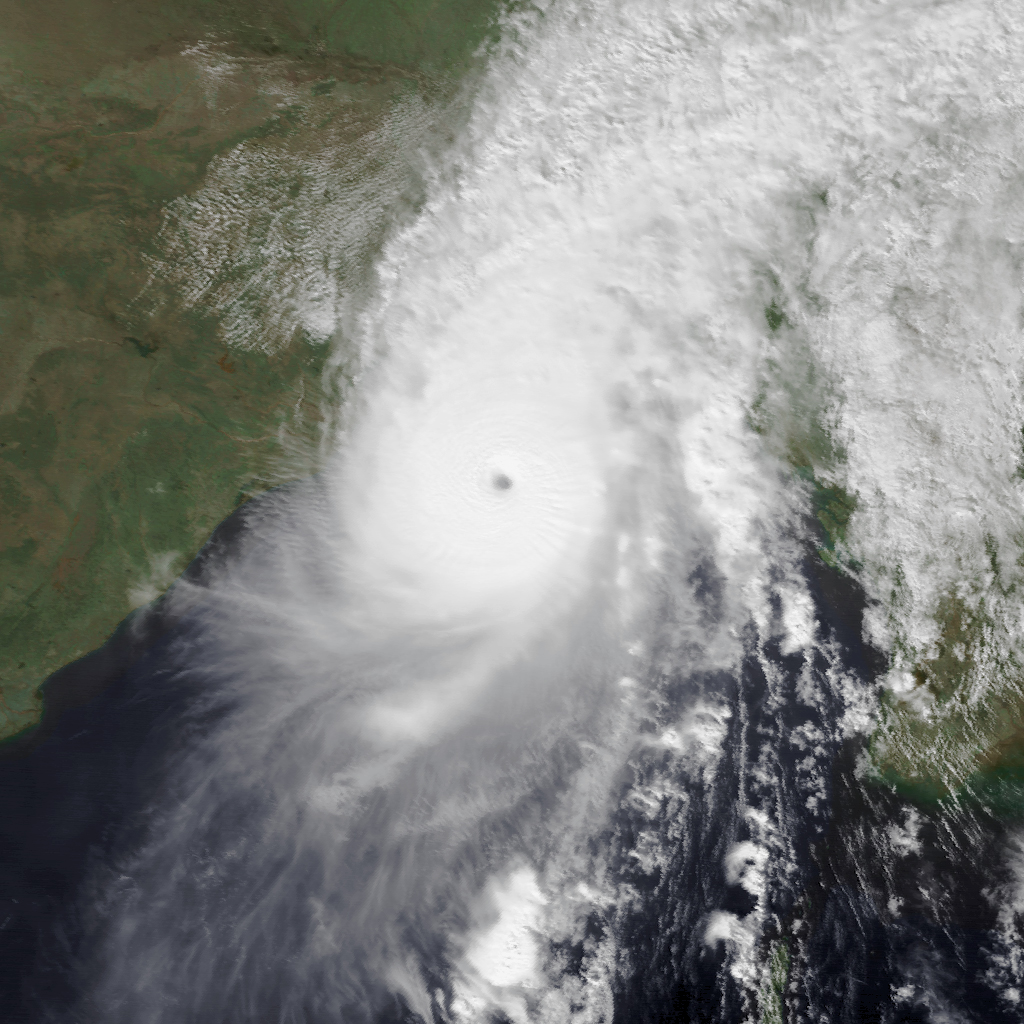
Cyclone Sidr

Tropical cyclones formed in November 2007
Storm name	Dates active	Max wind km/h (mph)	Pressure (hPa)	Areas affected	Damage (USD)	Deaths	Refs
Peipah (Kabayan)	November 1–10	130 (80)	970	Philippines, Vietnam	Unknown	50	
TD	November 2–3	Unspecified	1006	Vietnam	None	None	
Tapah	November 11–13	65 (40)	996	None	None	None	
Sidr	November 11–16	215 (130)	944	Andaman Islands, Bangladesh, West Bengal, Northeast India	$2.31 billion	~15,000	
Lee-Ariel	November 11–28	95 (60)	984	None	None	None	
Guba	November 13–20	140 (95)	970	Papua New Guinea, Queensland	$71.4 million	149	
Bongwe	November 17–28	105 (65)	976	None	None	None	
Hagibis (Lando)	November 18–27	130 (80)	970	Philippines, Vietnam	$5.3 million	22	
Mitag (Mina)	November 20–27	150 (90)	955	Philippines, Malaysia, Taiwan and Okinawa	$19.79 million	67	
02F	November 20–22	Unspecified	1001	Fiji	None	None	
03F	November 22 – December 2	Unspecified	999	Vanuatu, Fiji, Wallis and Futuna, Samoan Islands, Cook Islands	None	None	
25W	November 2–3	Unspecified	1004	None	None	None	
26W	November 2–3	Unspecified	996	None	None	None	

=== December ===
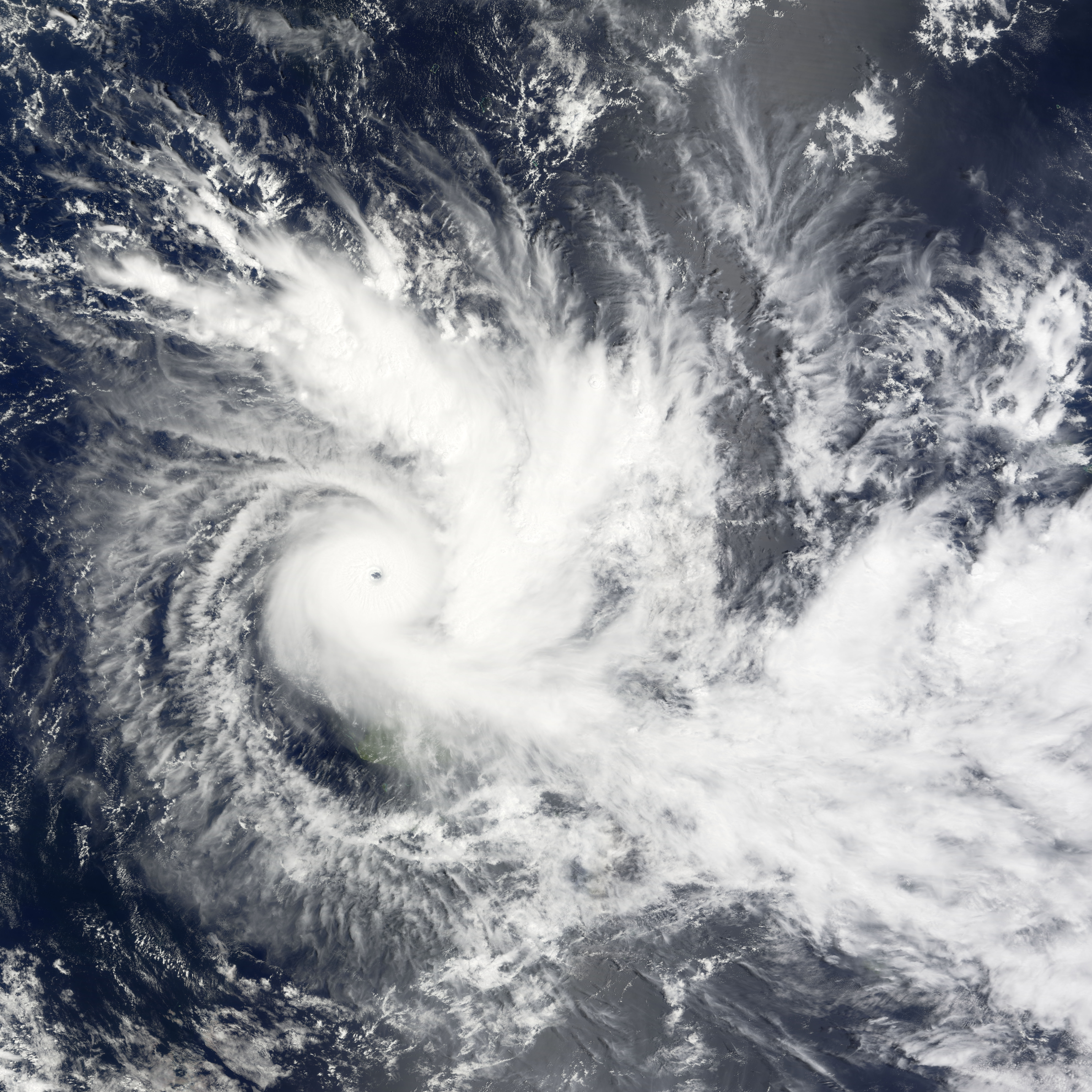
Cyclone Daman

Tropical cyclones formed in December 2007
Storm name	Dates active	Max wind km/h (mph)	Pressure (hPa)	Areas affected	Damage (USD)	Deaths	Refs
Daman	December 3–10	185 (115)	925	Fiji	$330 thousand	None	
Olga	December 11–13	95 (60)	1003	Puerto Rico, Hispaniola, Yucatán Peninsula, Florida	$45 million	40	
Celina	December 11–23	75 (45)	992	Madagascar	Minimal	None	
05F	December 11–14	55 (35)	1000	Vanuatu, New Caledonia	Unknown	Unknown	
Dama	December 17–22	65 (40)	995	None	None	None	
06F	December 26–28	35 (25)	1006	New Caledonia	Unknown	Unknown	
Melanie	December 28 – January 2	110 (70)	964	None	None	None	
Helen	December 28 – January 6	95 (60)	974	Far North Queensland, Northern Territory, Western Australia	$1.1 million	1	
Elnus	December 29 – January 3	65 (40)	995	Madagascar	None	None	
07U	December 31 – January 2	55 (35)	994	None	None	None	

== Global effects ==
There are a total of seven tropical cyclone basins that tropical cyclones typically form in this table, data from all these basins are added.

Season name		Areas affected	Systems formed	Named storms	Hurricane-force tropical cyclones	Damage (2007 USD)	Deaths	Ref.
North Atlantic Ocean (Note: The wind speeds for this tropical cyclone/basin are based on the Saffir Simpson Scale which uses 1-minute sustained winds.)		East Coast of the United States, Northeastern United States, Azores	17	15	6	$3.43 billion	460 (18)	
Eastern and Central Pacific Ocean		Southwestern Mexico, Hawaii, Baja California Peninsula, Western Mexico	15	11	4	≥$81.08 million	42	
Western Pacific Ocean (Note: Only systems that formed either before or on December 31, 2007 are counted in the seasonal totals.)		Mariana Islands, Caroline Islands, China, Vietnam, Japan, Aleutian Islands, Korean Peninsula, Russian Far East, Philippines, Taiwan, Ryukyu Islands, Laos, Thailand, Cambodia	44	24	16	$6.21 billion	449	
North Indian Ocean (Note: The wind speeds for this tropical cyclone/basin are based on the IMD Scale which uses 3-minute sustained winds.)		Thailand, Myanmar, Andaman Islands, Nicobar Islands, Bangladesh, Burma, Western India, Oman, United Arab Emirates, Iran, Pakistan, Afghanistan, West Bengal, Northeast India, Southwest China	11	4	3	$9.81 billion	16,381	
South-West Indian Ocean	January – June (Note: Only systems that formed either on or after January 1, 2007 are counted in the seasonal totals.) (Note: The wind speeds for this tropical cyclone are based on Météo-France, which uses wind gusts.)	Rodrigues, Mozambique, Madagascar, Mascarene Islands	8	7	6	$431 million	165	
South-West Indian Ocean	July – December	Madagascar	6	5	1	—N/a	1	
Australian region	January – June	Western Australia, Solomon Islands, Papua New Guinea, Torres Straits	7	5	3	$15.7 million	5	
Australian region	July – December	Papua New Guinea, Australia	4	3	1	$71.4 million	149	
South Pacific Ocean	January – June	Samoan Islands, French Polynesia, Fiji, Solomon Islands, Vanuatu, New Caledonia	7	4	2	Unknown	Unknown	
South Pacific Ocean	July – December	Solomon Islands, Fiji, Tonga	6	1	1	$330,000	—N/a	
Worldwide			125 (Note: The sum of the number of systems in each basin will not equal the number shown as the total. This is because when systems move between basins, it creates a discrepancy in the actual number of systems.)	79	43	$20.05 billion	17,652 (18)	

== See also ==
- Tropical cyclones by year
- List of earthquakes in 2007
- Tornadoes of 2007

== Notes ==
^{1} Only systems that formed either on or after January 1, 2007 are counted in the seasonal totals.
^{2} Only systems that formed either before or on December 31, 2007 are counted in the seasonal totals.
^{3} The wind speeds for this tropical cyclone/basin are based on the IMD Scale which uses 3-minute sustained winds.
^{4} The wind speeds for this tropical cyclone/basin are based on the Saffir Simpson Scale which uses 1-minute sustained winds.
^{5}The wind speeds for this tropical cyclone are based on Météo-France which uses gust winds.
