= Cyclone Indlala =

South-West Indian cyclone in 2007

Intense Tropical Cyclone Indlala
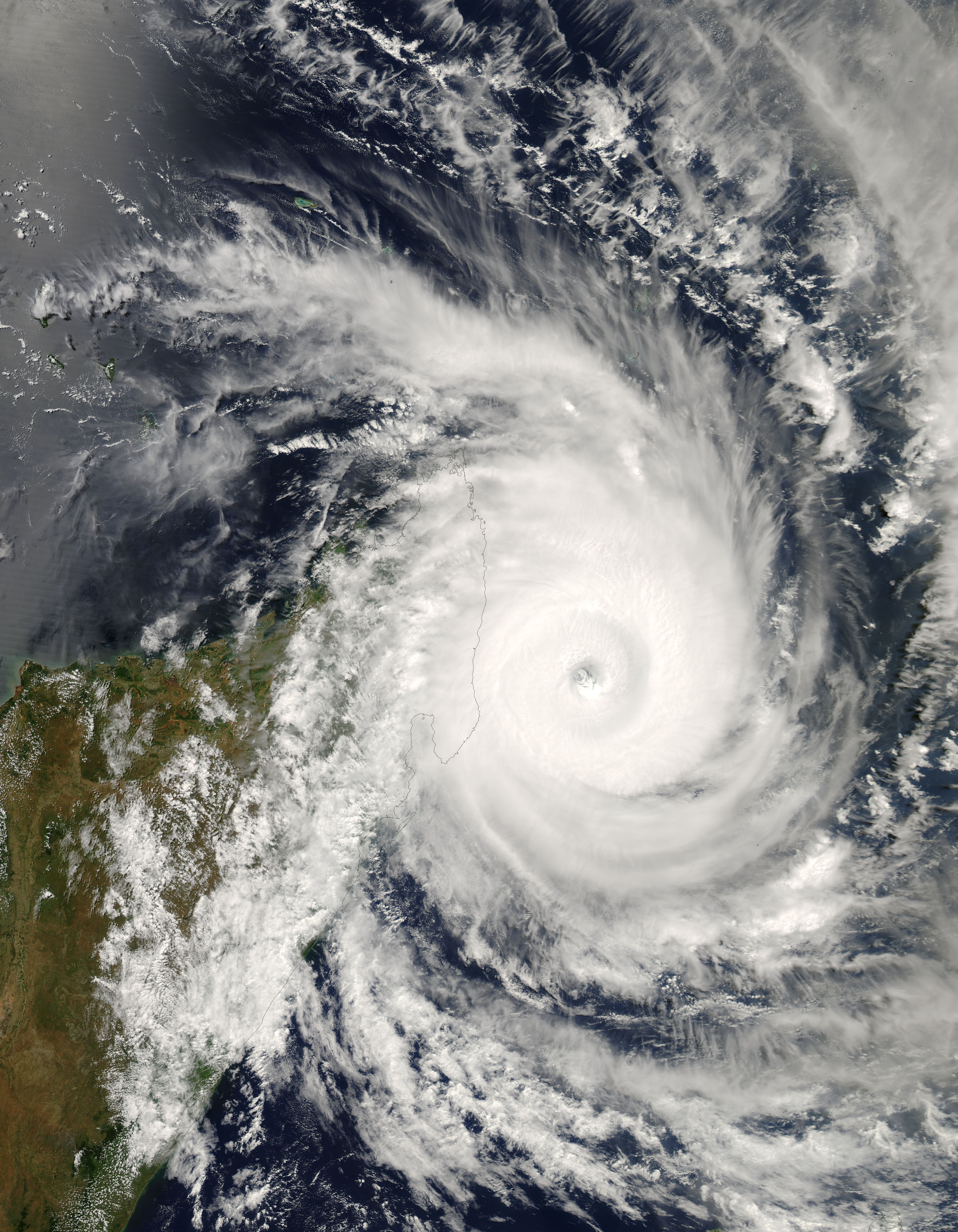
- Intense Tropical Cyclone Indlala near peak strength on 14 March

Meteorological history
- Formed: 9 March 2007
- Dissipated: 18 March 2007

Intense tropical cyclone
- 10-minute sustained (MFR)
- Highest winds: 175 km/h (110 mph)
- Highest gusts: 250 km/h (155 mph)
- Lowest pressure: 935 hPa (mbar); 27.61 inHg

Category 4-equivalent tropical cyclone
- 1-minute sustained (SSHWS/JTWC)
- Highest winds: 220 km/h (140 mph)
- Lowest pressure: 927 hPa (mbar); 27.37 inHg

Overall effects
- Fatalities: 150 total
- Damage: >$240 million (2007 USD)
- Areas affected: St. Brandon, Agaléga, Madagascar
- IBTrACS
- Part of the 2006–07 South-West Indian Ocean cyclone season

Intense Tropical Cyclone Indlala was a powerful tropical cyclone that struck northeastern Madagascar in March 2007. The ninth named storm and fifth intense tropical cyclone of the 2006–07 South-West Indian Ocean cyclone season, Indlala developed on 3 March 2007 southwest of the Chagos Archipelago in the central Indian Ocean. Initially a tropical disturbance, Indlala moved generally westward in its formative stages, attaining tropical cyclone status on 13 March. A day later, the Météo-France office on Réunion (MFR) estimated peak 10–minute sustained winds of 175 km/h (110 mph), although the American-based Joint Typhoon Warning Center estimated stronger 1–minute winds of 220 km/h (135 mph). Early on 15 March, the cyclone made landfall in northeastern Madagascar on the Masoala Peninsula near Antalaha, still at its peak intensity according to the MFR. Indlala rapidly weakened over land and turned southward, eventually re-emerging into the Indian Ocean on 18 March; it was last noted by the MFR on 19 March.

Indlala first affected the sparsely populated islands of St. Brandon and Agaléga, producing wind gusts of 65 km/h (40 mph) on the former island. The cyclone struck Madagascar a few months after the country experienced a series of deadly floods and other cyclones. Indlala killed 150 people and injured another 126. Monetary damage was estimated at over US$240 million. Severe flooding, strong winds, and heavy rainfall wrecked cities in the immediate vicinity of its landfall point. Farther inland and along the country's northwest coast, flooding cut access to roads, which disrupted the response to the storm. Individuals, national governments, United Nations agencies, and the International Federation of Red Cross and Red Crescent Societies helped residents affected by the cyclone cope with its aftermath.

== Meteorological history ==
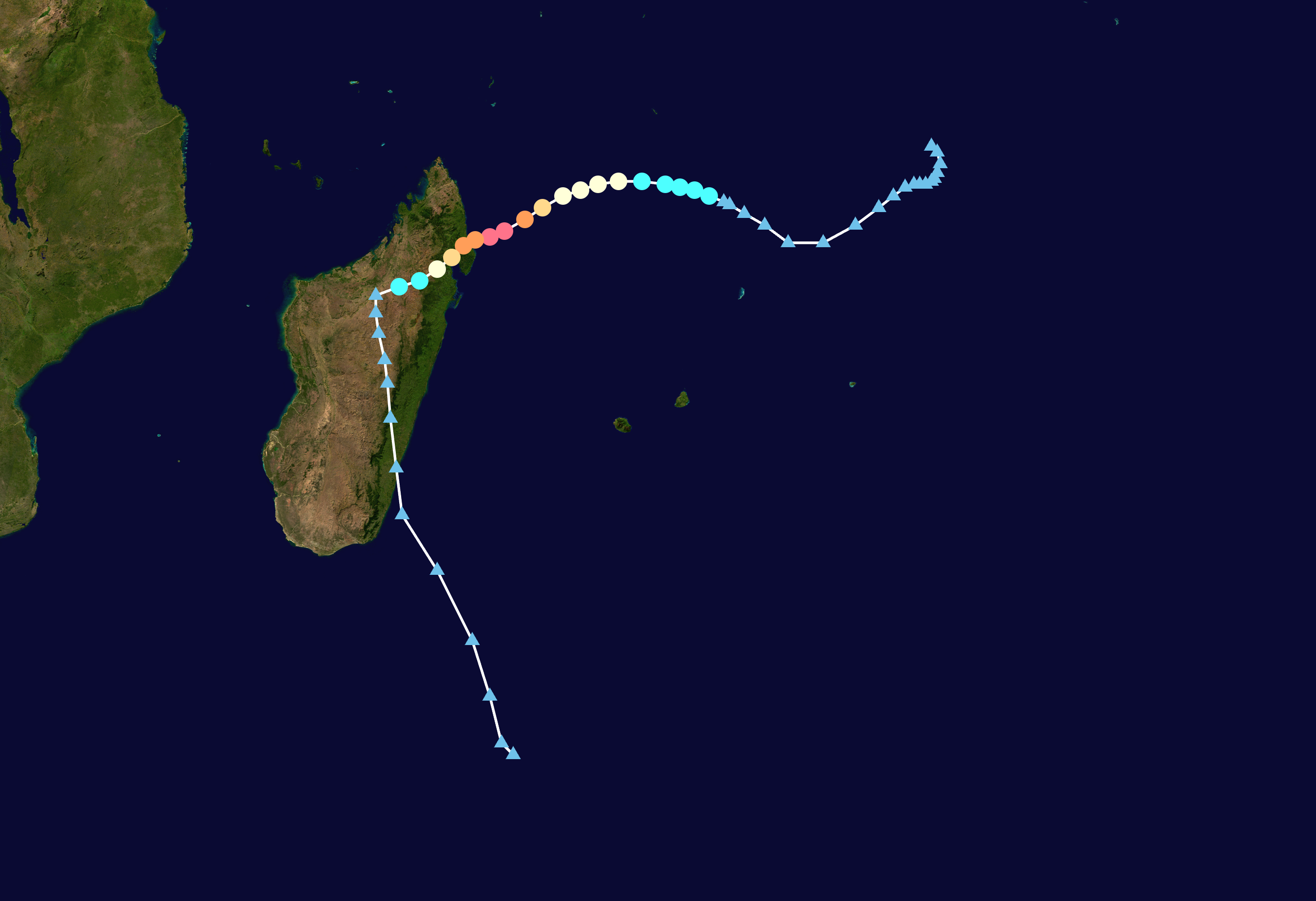
Map plotting the track and the intensity of the storm, according to the Joint Typhoon Warning Center Map key Saffir–Simpson scale Tropical depression (≤38 mph, ≤62 km/h) Tropical storm (39–73 mph, 63–118 km/h) Category 1 (74–95 mph, 119–153 km/h) Category 2 (96–110 mph, 154–177 km/h) Category 3 (111–129 mph, 178–208 km/h) Category 4 (130–156 mph, 209–251 km/h) Category 5 (≥157 mph, ≥252 km/h) Unknown Storm type Tropical cyclone Subtropical cyclone Extratropical cyclone, remnant low, tropical disturbance, or monsoon depression

The Intertropical Convergence Zone spawned an area of convection, or thunderstorms, on 9 March, located southwest of the Chagos Archipelago in the central Indian Ocean. A circulation developed within the system, situated in a favorable area of low wind shear beneath an anticyclone. On 10 March, the Météo-France meteorological office in Réunion (MFR) designated the system as Tropical Disturbance 12. On the same day, the American-based Joint Typhoon Warning Center (JTWC) issued a Tropical Cyclone Formation Alert, after a further increase in convection. The nascent system moved generally westward, steered by a ridge over the Mascarene Islands. On 11 March, the MFR upgraded the system to Tropical Depression 12, after an expansion of outflow and an increase in banding features. A day later, the MFR upgraded the system to a tropical storm, naming it Indlada first, before correcting the name to Indlala. Also on 12 March, the JTWC initiated advisories on the system, designating it Tropical Cyclone 19S.

With favorable atmospheric conditions, Indlala continued to strengthen as its convection organized, becoming a severe tropical storm late on 12 March. A trough over South Africa disrupted the ridge, causing the storm to turn toward the southwest. The next day, the MFR upgraded Indlala to tropical cyclone status – with 10–minute sustained winds of at least 120 km/h (75 mph), the equivalent of a hurricane. A small, well-defined eye formed in the center of the storm as it approached northeastern Madagascar. On 14 March, the MFR upgraded Indlala further to an intense tropical cyclone, estimating peak 10–minute winds of 175 km/h (110 mph), and a minimum barometric pressure of 935 mbar (27.6 inHg). The JTWC's intensity estimate was higher, with peak 1–minute winds of 220 km/h (135 mph).

Indlala underwent an eyewall replacement cycle around the time of its peak intensity. Around 00:00 UTC on 15 March, the cyclone made landfall in northeastern Madagascar on the Masoala Peninsula near Antalaha, still at its peak intensity according to the MFR. Indlala rapidly weakened as it progressed inland. The JTWC discontinued advisories on 16 March, by which time the MFR had downgraded the cyclone to a tropical depression. The system moved southward through Madagascar, eventually re-emerging into the Indian Ocean on 18 March near Manambondro. The weak system continued to the south-southeast, and was last noted by the MFR on 19 March.

== Impact ==
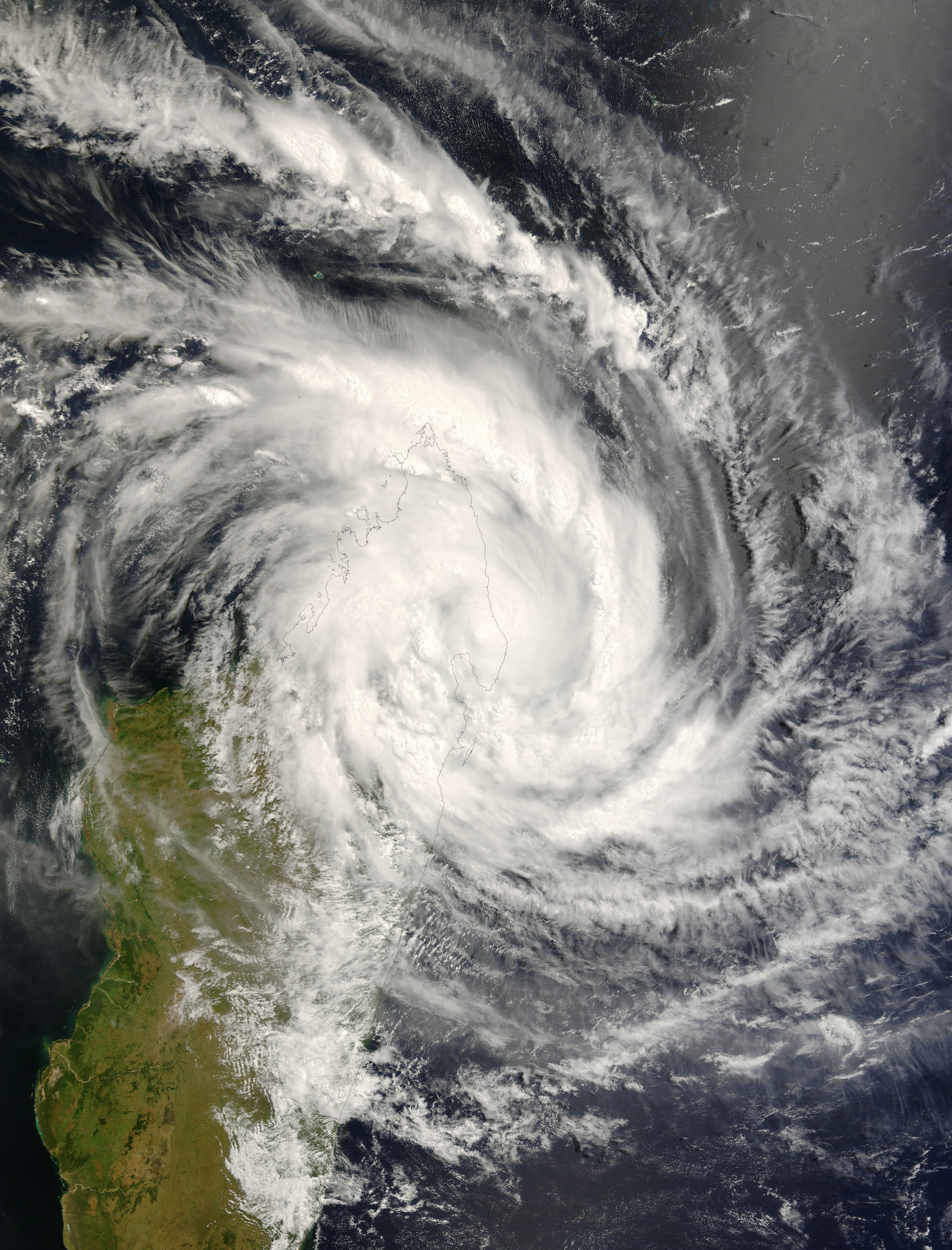
Cyclone Indlala making landfall in Madagascar on 15 March

In its formative stages, Indlala passed north of the sparsely populated St. Brandon. Rainfall on the island reached 25.5 mm (1.00 in), and winds reached 65 km/h (40 mph). Later, the storm passed south of Agaléga, producing gusts of 48 km/h (30 mph) there.

Indlala was the fifth tropical cyclone to hit or affect Madagascar in the span of three months, after Bondo, Clovis, Favio, and Gamede. The series of floods diminished the country's stock of supplies from United Nations agencies, spurring an appeal for international assistance and a declaration of a national emergency. Across northern Madagascar, Cyclone Indlala dropped heavy rainfall and produced hurricane-force wind gusts. At Antalaha near where it moved ashore, a station recorded 355.2 mm (13.98 in) of rainfall over 24 hours. The same city recorded gusts of 245 km/h (152 mph). Antsohihy in northern Madagascar recorded 585.4 mm (23.05 in) of rainfall over 48 hours. The cyclone killed 150 people across Madagascar, with another 126 injured. Damage in the country was estimated at over US$240 million.

Across Madagascar, Indlala damaged or destroyed 54,000 houses, leaving 188,331 people homeless. Houses with iron roofs fared better than traditionally built houses. The regions of Madagascar hardest hit by Indlala were Diana, Analanjirofo, Atsinanana, Atsimo-Atsinanana, and Vatovavy-Fitovinany along the country's east coast; Sava, Sofia, and Boeny along the northwest coast; and the inland regions of Betsiboka and Alaotra-Mangoro. Indlala affected vital institutions, with 228 schools and 71 hospitals damaged to some degree. High winds and heavy rainfall damaged roads in northern Madagascar, with 103 bridges damaged, while landslides blocked access to some communities. Throughout Madagascar, the cyclone wrecked about 90,000 ha (220,000 acres) worth of crops. This included about 20,877 ha (51,590 acres) of lost rice, leaving residents without food.

Flooding from Indlala affected a 131,700 km^{2} (50,800 mi^{2}) area of northern Madagascar, notably in the cities of Antalaha, Maroantsetra, and Sambava, where the cyclone severed phone lines and caused power outages. In Maroantsetra, the cyclone destroyed the roof of a prison; ten prisoners escaped, and three were re-arrested. The entire town of Maroantsetra was flooded, as were 90% of surrounding villages, reaching at least 0.8 m (2.6 ft) deep. Rising rivers forced families to flee their homes and gather in the city hall. Small communities lost radio contact for two days. Most of the water wells in Maroantsetra were contaminated, leaving 25,000 people without access to clean drinking water. North of its landfall point, Indlala wrecked about 40% of Antalaha's buildings. The storm washed away boats, blew away roofs, contaminated wells, and decimated crops. The local vanilla crop was finally starting to mature after Cyclone Gafilo's destructive landfall in 2004. Indlala wrecked about 90% of the vanilla orchids in and around Antalaha, and about 80% of the country's vanilla production. East of the country's capital Antananarivo, the cyclone damaged a power station, causing power outages. In Ambanja along Madagascar's northwest coast, flooding displaced about 9,000 people, after a rapid rise of water 3 m (9.8 ft) high. In Sofia region in northwest Madagascar, floods were the region's worst since 1959. Flooding in the Diana and Sofia regions killed 95 people, with 20,000 people left homeless.

== Aftermath ==
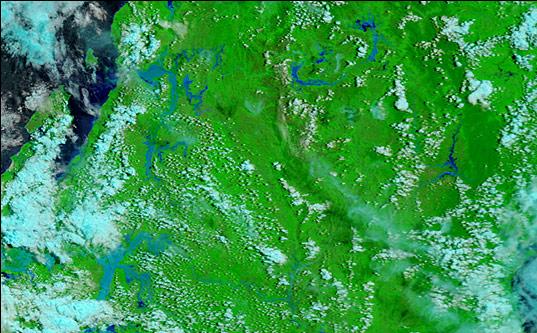
Satellite image of floods in Madagascar caused by Indlala

Outages in the road and communication network disrupted damage assessments and aid distribution. Members of the Red Cross worked with volunteers and Malagasy officials to respond to the cyclone, including disaster assessment and inspecting water systems. A team of 160 volunteers and Red Cross members provided meals to more than 55,000 people. Helicopters airdropped food and supplies to 202 families in isolated areas. The price of rice rose after the storm, with a 5% increase in the cost of the makalioka variety by March 19. Residents who lost their houses in Ambario rebuilt in nearby Marovantaza.

The Red Cross launched an appeal for just over US$2 million to fund the agency's response in the country through the end of December 2007; much of the funds were covered by the British and Swedish governments, with nine national Red Cross organizations funding the rest. Teams with the organization Medair disinfected water wells and provided cleaning supplies to households. Helicopters and trucks delivered emergency goods to residents in Sofia region. The Malagasy government appealed citizens for private donations on March 29. A few weeks after Indlala struck, Cyclone Jaya also hit northeast Madagascar, further disrupting the response to the cyclone. In April 2007, the United Nations Disaster Assessment and Coordination sent a team to help coordinate the local and international response to Madagascar's series of cyclones. The series of storms left about 150,000 children unable to attend school, although most of them were able to return after Easter break in early April. After the series of floods, the World Food Programme allocated US$1 million worth of food, in which the agency distributed more than 733 metric tons (MT) of food through other agencies. The WFP and UNICEF together airlifted 58,900 people with more than 131 MT worth of food. The initial emergency period after cyclones Indlala and Jaya concluded by June 2007, as the needs shifted toward reconstruction.

As an immediate response to Indlala, the American embassy in Antananarivo released US$100,000 for urgent relief operations, and Germany sent €22,000 to help storm victims. The European Parliament granted €1.5 million in humanitarian assistance to help with food insecurity. France donated €700,000 in assistance to the WFP and Groupe de Recherches et d'Echanges Technologiques. The French Red Cross deployed its helicopter cruiser French cruiser Jeanne d'Arc with 40 MT of emergency supplies, along with a team of four disaster management experts to assist the Malagasy Red Cross. Nearby Comoros donated 500 MT of rice. Food for Peace sent 2,000 MT of food, worth US$1.5 million.

== See also ==
- Tropical cyclones in 2007
- Cyclone Ivan (2008) – powerful cyclone that struck Madagascar slightly to the south of Indlala
- Cyclone Bingiza (2011) – strong cyclone that struck Madagascar near where Indlala hit
