= Cyclone Arthur (2007) =

Category 2 South Pacific cyclone in 2007

Tropical Cyclone Arthur
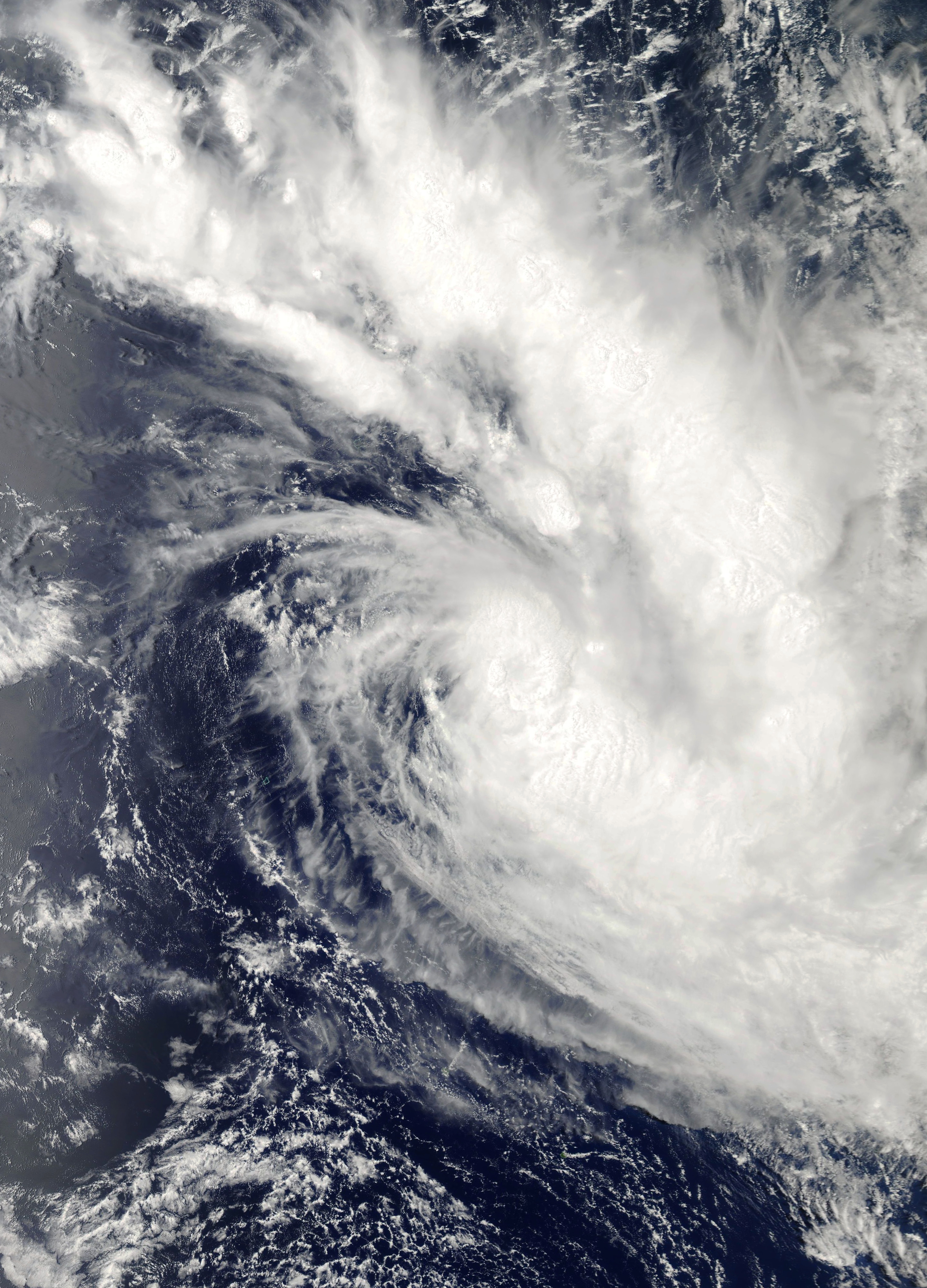
- Tropical Cyclone Arthur near peak intensity on January 25

Meteorological history
- Formed: January 20, 2007
- Dissipated: January 27, 2007

Category 2 tropical cyclone
- 10-minute sustained (FMS)
- Highest winds: 110 km/h (70 mph)
- Lowest pressure: 975 hPa (mbar); 28.79 inHg

Category 1-equivalent tropical cyclone
- 1-minute sustained (SSHWS/JTWC)
- Highest winds: 120 km/h (75 mph)
- Lowest pressure: 974 hPa (mbar); 28.76 inHg

Overall effects
- Fatalities: None reported
- Damage: Minimal
- Areas affected: Cook Islands and French Polynesia
- IBTrACS
- Part of the 2006–07 South Pacific cyclone season

Cyclone Arthur (RSMC Nadi designation: 08F, JTWC designation: 09P) was the eighth tropical depression and fourth tropical cyclone of the 2006–07 South Pacific cyclone season. Forming as tropical depression on January 25, Arthur rapidly intensified into a strong Category 2 cyclone on the Australian intensity scale according to the Regional Specialized Meteorological Centre in Nadi, Fiji. The Joint Typhoon Warning Center assessed the storm to have peaked as a minimal category 1 cyclone. Shortly after peaking in intensity, the cyclone began to weaken due to unfavorable conditions. Quickly moving towards the east-southeast, the Arthur began to undergo an extratropical transition. After turning towards the southeast, the center of circulation was almost fully exposed due to strong wind shear. However, Arthur briefly re-strengthened late on January 26 before becoming extratropical the next day. Tropical Cyclone Arthur affected several small islands during its existence. French Polynesia observed the most noteworthy effects from the storm, where several landslides damaged a few homes.

== Meteorological history ==
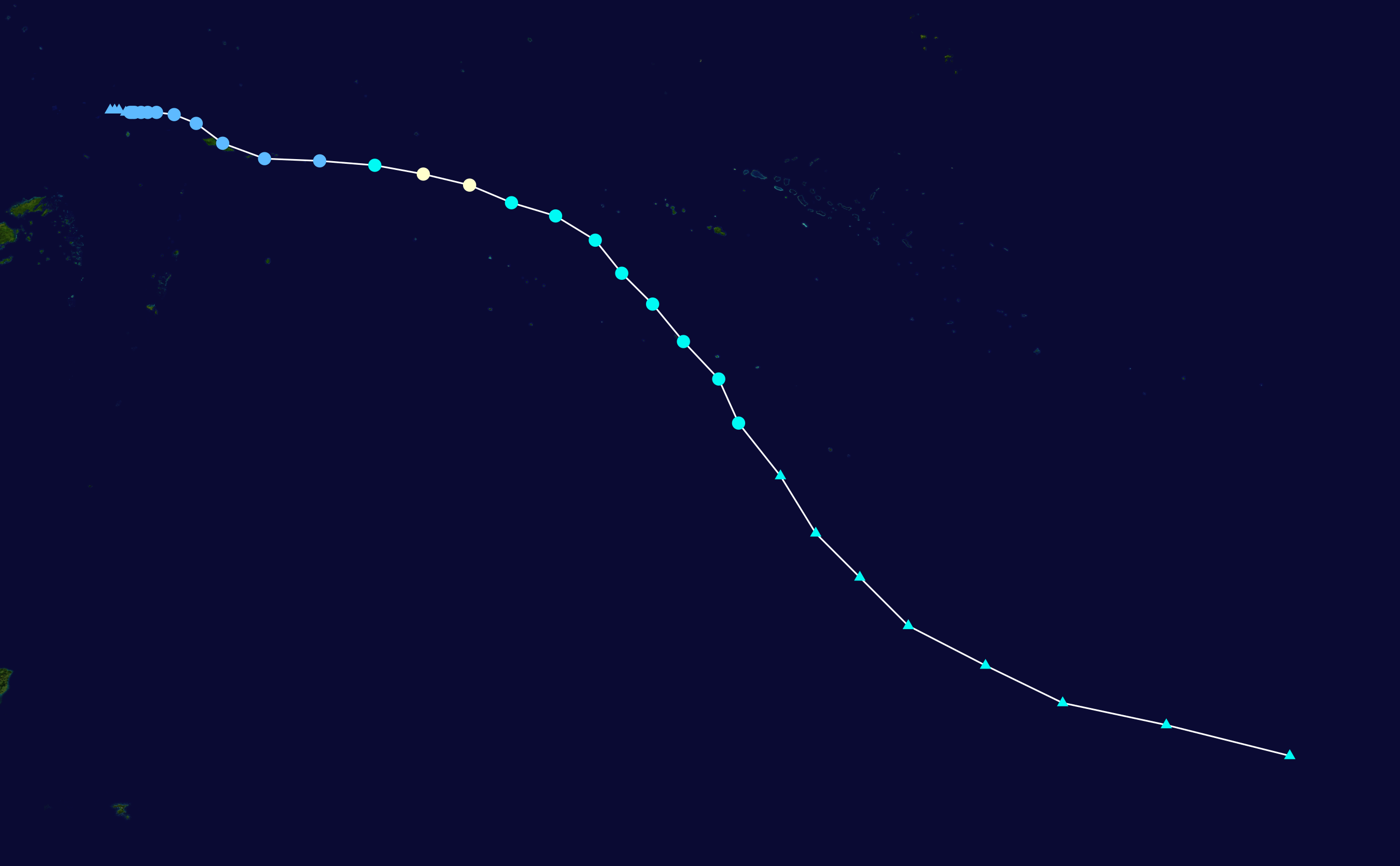
Map plotting the storm's track and intensity, according to the Saffir–Simpson scale Map key Saffir–Simpson scale Tropical depression (≤38 mph, ≤62 km/h) Tropical storm (39–73 mph, 63–118 km/h) Category 1 (74–95 mph, 119–153 km/h) Category 2 (96–110 mph, 154–177 km/h) Category 3 (111–129 mph, 178–208 km/h) Category 4 (130–156 mph, 209–251 km/h) Category 5 (≥157 mph, ≥252 km/h) Unknown Storm type Tropical cyclone Subtropical cyclone Extratropical cyclone, remnant low, tropical disturbance, or monsoon depression

During January 21, 2007, the Fiji Meteorological Service (FMS) reported that Tropical Depression 08F had developed about 435 km (270 mi) to the west-northwest of Savai'i in Samoa. The depression slowly traveled towards the east-southeast for several days as the overall structure of the storm fluctuated due to diurnal variations and strong wind shear. Around 1700 UTC on January 22, the Joint Typhoon Warning Center (JTWC) issued a Tropical Cyclone Formation Alert for the depression. The system developed a large banding feature in the northern portion of the circulation and deep convection formed around the center of circulation. The depression had moved into an area of weak to moderate wind shear with favorable diffulence aloft. Later that day, gale warnings were issued for the northeastern quadrant of the system. Tropical Depression 08F continued to develop as an anticyclone developed above the system, enhancing the environment around it. A mid-latitude trough located north of the depression was steering it towards the east.

Early on January 24, the system became better organized and strengthened into a cyclone at 0600 UTC. The storm, which was named Arthur by the FMS, began to undergo rapid intensification as the structure improved significantly. Deep convection developed around the center with strong outflow towards the north. Several hours after becoming a cyclone, the JTWC issued their first advisory on Tropical Cyclone 09P as it traveled quickly towards the east-southeast. The quick movement was due to the influences of subtropical ridge to the north and a trough to the south. Later that day, a banding eye feature began to develop as the storm intensified into a Category 2 cyclone on the Australian intensity scale. At 1800 UTC, the JTWC assessed Arthur to have reached its peak intensity with winds of 120 km/h (75 mph) 1-minute winds), the equivalent of a minimal Category 1 hurricane on the Saffir–Simpson scale. Early on January 25, Arthur reached its peak intensity with winds of 110 km/h (68 mph) 10-minute winds) with a minimum pressure of 975 hPa (mbar) while located about 635 km (395 mi) north-northwest of Rarotonga. Shortly after peaking in intensity, Arthur began to undergo an extratropical transition and rapidly deteriorated due to strong wind shear.

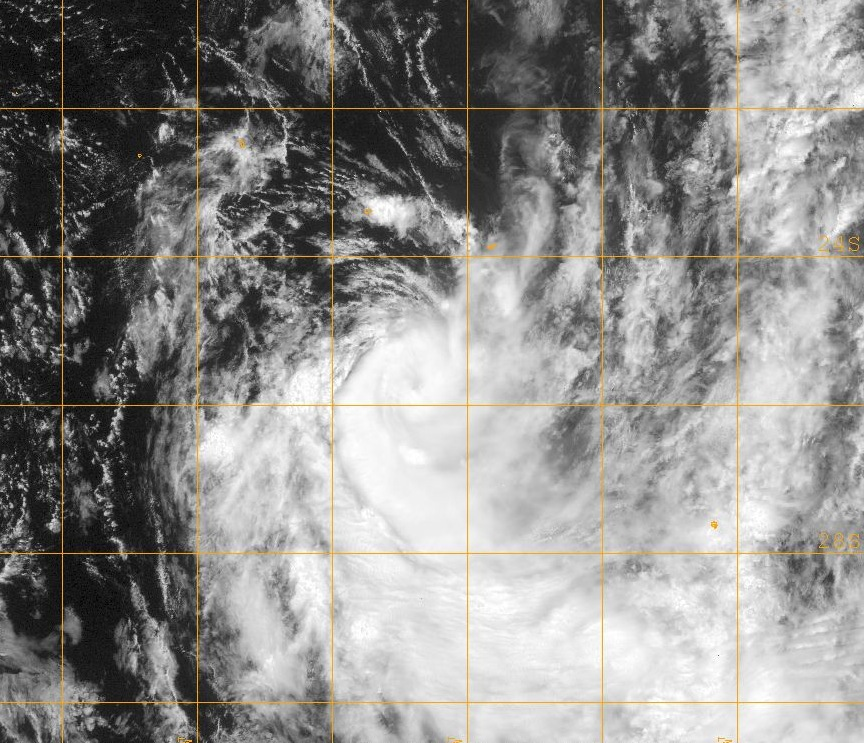
Tropical Cyclone Arthur on January 26

The storm also began to merge with a low-level frontal boundary associated with the remnants of Tropical Cyclone Zita. The strong shear left the center of circulation partially exposed, with deep convection persisting in only the southeastern quadrant. In addition to the shear, dry air began to enter the system, causing it to weaken further. While continuing to move at a quick pace, the storm began to turn towards the southeast along a baroclinic zone. Early on January 26, the JTWC issued their final advisory on the cyclone as it lost most of its tropical characteristics. Arthur re-intensified shortly after and the JTWC reissued advisories on the storm around 2100 UTC. The brief re-strengthening was the result of a breakdown in the baroclinic zone which allowed convection to redevelop around the center. Around the same time, Arthur left the FMS's area of responsibility (AoR) and entered the New Zealand's MetService's AoR. The storm completed its extratropical transition around 1200 UTC on January 27, leading to the final advisory being issued on the storm.

== Preparations and impact ==
On January 21, a gale watch was issued for Tutuila, American Samoa, Manu'a, and Swains Island as Tropical Depression 08F approached the islands. Winds of up to 55 km/h (34 mph), with gusts up to 75 km/h (47 mph), were expected. Small craft advisories were issued for the Cook Islands due to large swells produced by the storm. All of the watches were cancelled late on January 23 as the depression was no longer forecast to impact the islands. On January 24, an Orange Alert was issued for the Austral Islands. As the storm neared the region, the alert was upgraded to a Red Alert for Rurutu and Tubuai. Arthur produced minor damages in the Cook Islands—primarily consisting of beach erosion—on January 24. Heavy rains throughout French Polynesia resulted in several landslides which damaged several homes on Tahiti and Moorea. Waves near the islands ranged from 1.5 to 2 m (4.9 to 6.6 ft). Winds in Tubuai reached 85 km/h (53 mph) 10-minute winds) with gusts up to 115 km/h (71 mph). Several homes were damaged and roads were blocked by fallen trees throughout the island. Minor coastal flooding also occurred due to the large swells.

== See also ==
- 2006–07 South Pacific cyclone season
