= Cyclone Favio =

South-West Indian cyclone in 2007

Intense Tropical Cyclone Favio
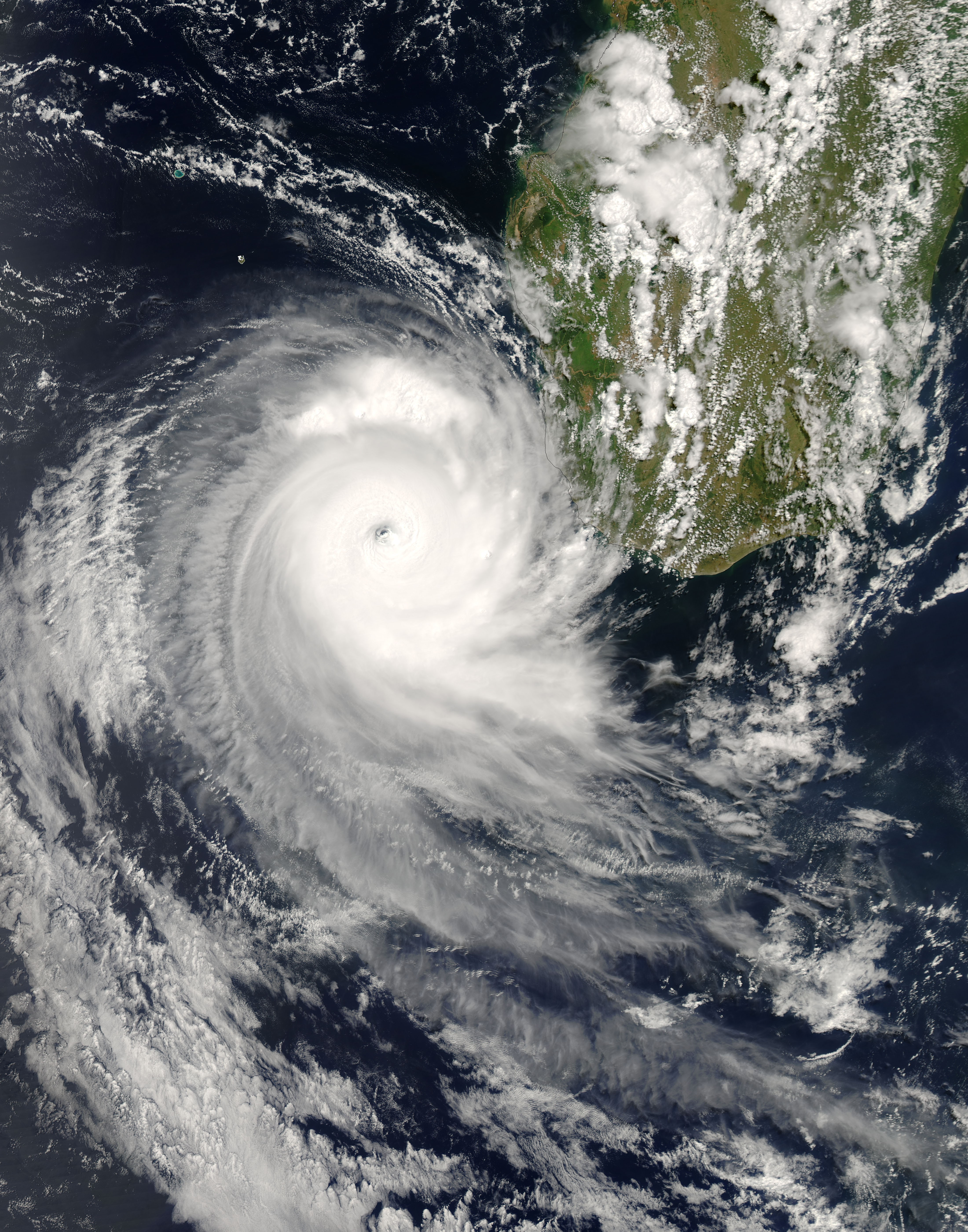
- Cyclone Favio on 20 February

Meteorological history
- Formed: 11 February 2007
- Dissipated: 23 February 2007

Intense tropical cyclone
- 10-minute sustained (MFR)
- Highest winds: 195 km/h (120 mph)
- Lowest pressure: 925 hPa (mbar); 27.32 inHg

Category 4-equivalent tropical cyclone
- 1-minute sustained (SSHWS/JTWC)
- Highest winds: 220 km/h (140 mph)
- Lowest pressure: 922 hPa (mbar); 27.23 inHg

Overall effects
- Fatalities: 10 total
- Damage: $71 million (2007 USD)
- Areas affected: Madagascar, Mozambique, Tanzania, Zimbabwe, Malawi
- IBTrACS
- Part of the 2006–07 South-West Indian Ocean cyclone season

Intense Tropical Cyclone Favio was the first known tropical cyclone that passed south of Madagascar to strike mainland Africa as an intense tropical cyclone. Early on 11 February 2007, a zone of disturbed weather formed east of Madagascar. Four days later, Favio was named as intensified to a moderate tropical storm while moving southwest. On 18 February, the storm was upgraded into a severe tropical storm. Then, it turned west in the general direction of Mozambique. Continuing to intensify, Favio was upgraded to a tropical cyclone early on 19 February. Subsequently, the storm began to undergo rapid deepening; the small storm reached intense tropical cyclone status the next day before peaking in intensity. However, the cyclone had weakened somewhat prior to making landfall on 22 February in the Inhambane Province in Mozambique. It rapidly weakened over land and dissipated the next day.

While strengthening, Favio brought heavy rains to southern Madagascar. After making landfall, Intense Tropical Cyclone Favio brought widespread damage to Vilanculos in Mozambique, where the cyclone killed four people and injured at least 70 in the town. About 80% of the town was destroyed. Overall, a total of ten people were killed by the storm and nearly 100 others were injured, and combined with an earlier flood, the storm caused $71 million (2007 USD) in damage. Around 130,000 homes suffered damage and 130 schools were leveled by the tropical cyclone. Across the nation, a total of 33,000 people were left homeless during the system. Cyclone Favio destroyed 277,000 ha (684,480 acres) of crops. In Zimbabwe, 400 electricity poles were downed. During the aftermath of the storm, a number of agencies provided assistance to victims of Cyclone Favio in Mozambique. One agency donated $626,500, helping transport 50,000 mosquito nets to the devastated area. A total of 5,500 bars of soap, 1,600 buckets, 50 baths, and over 180 latrines were distributed to the victims of the devastated area. In all, the government was praised for how well they handled the disaster.

== Meteorological history ==
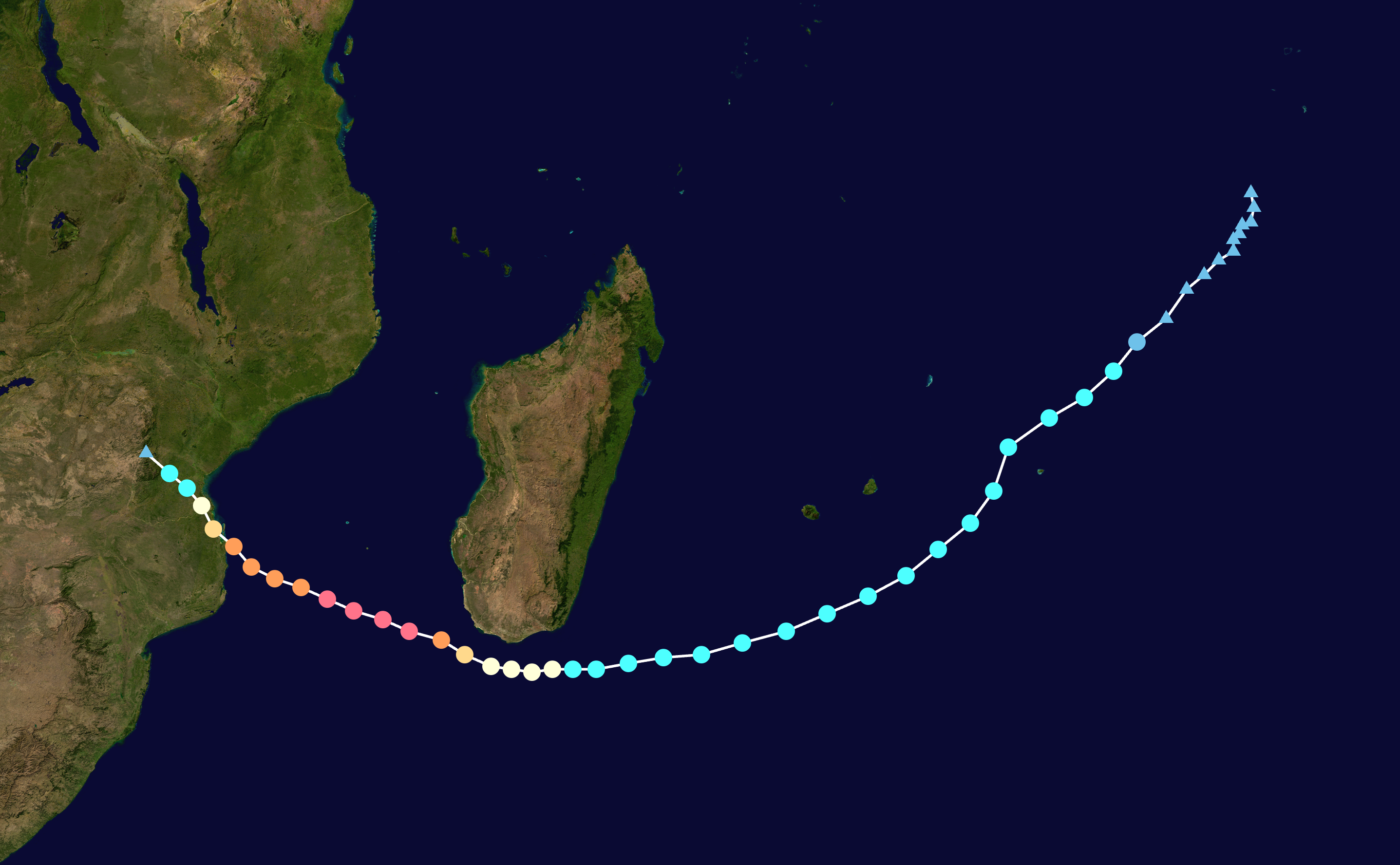
Map plotting the storm's track and intensity, according to the Saffir–Simpson scale Map key Saffir–Simpson scale Tropical depression (≤38 mph, ≤62 km/h) Tropical storm (39–73 mph, 63–118 km/h) Category 1 (74–95 mph, 119–153 km/h) Category 2 (96–110 mph, 154–177 km/h) Category 3 (111–129 mph, 178–208 km/h) Category 4 (130–156 mph, 209–251 km/h) Category 5 (≥157 mph, ≥252 km/h) Unknown Storm type Tropical cyclone Subtropical cyclone Extratropical cyclone, remnant low, tropical disturbance, or monsoon depression

Cyclone Favio originated from a zone of disturbed weather that was first classified by the Météo-France office on Réunion (MFR) at 1200 UTC 11 February 2007. Twelve hours later, the Joint Typhoon Warning Center (JTWC) issued their first advisory on the system. Midday on 12 February, the MFR upgraded the system into a tropical disturbance and noted that its rating at that time on the Dvorak technique was 2.0.

According to the JTWC, an area of convection developed 340 mi (545 km) south-southwest of Diego Garcia. Initially, however, the convection was not very concentrated near the center. However, sea surface temperatures in the area were somewhat warm so gradual intensification was predicted and the storm was projected to become a severe tropical storm within 48 hours. Situated in an environment of low wind shear and good outflow, thunderstorm activity soon increased and thus started to consolidate around the storm's atmospheric circulation. Continuing to encounter more favorable conditions, the JTWC issued a Tropical Cyclone Formation Alert (TCFA) on 14 February. Meanwhile, MFR upgraded the system into a tropical depression. Eighteen hours later, the system was named Favio by the Meteorological Services of Mauritius as the system; according to MFR, had intensified into a moderate tropical storm.

Moving very steadily southwest, the storm gradually intensified. Early on February 15, the JTWC announced that that system had intensified into a tropical storm. After intensifying slightly (based on JTWC data) that evening, the storm briefly weakened overnight, only to re-intensify the next morning. On 16 February, Favio turned southwest in response to a large subtropical ridge. Despite low wind shear, Favio remained a moderate tropical storm for several days; however, on 18 February, MFR announced that Favio had intensified into a severe tropical storm. Subsequently, the storm turned west as the ridge merged with another one centered over South Africa. Two days later, the agency then upgraded the system into cyclone status. At 00:00 UTC on 19 February, the JTWC upgraded the system into a Category 1 hurricane-equivalent on the Saffir–Simpson hurricane wind scale (SSHWS) though not much additional intensification was predicted.

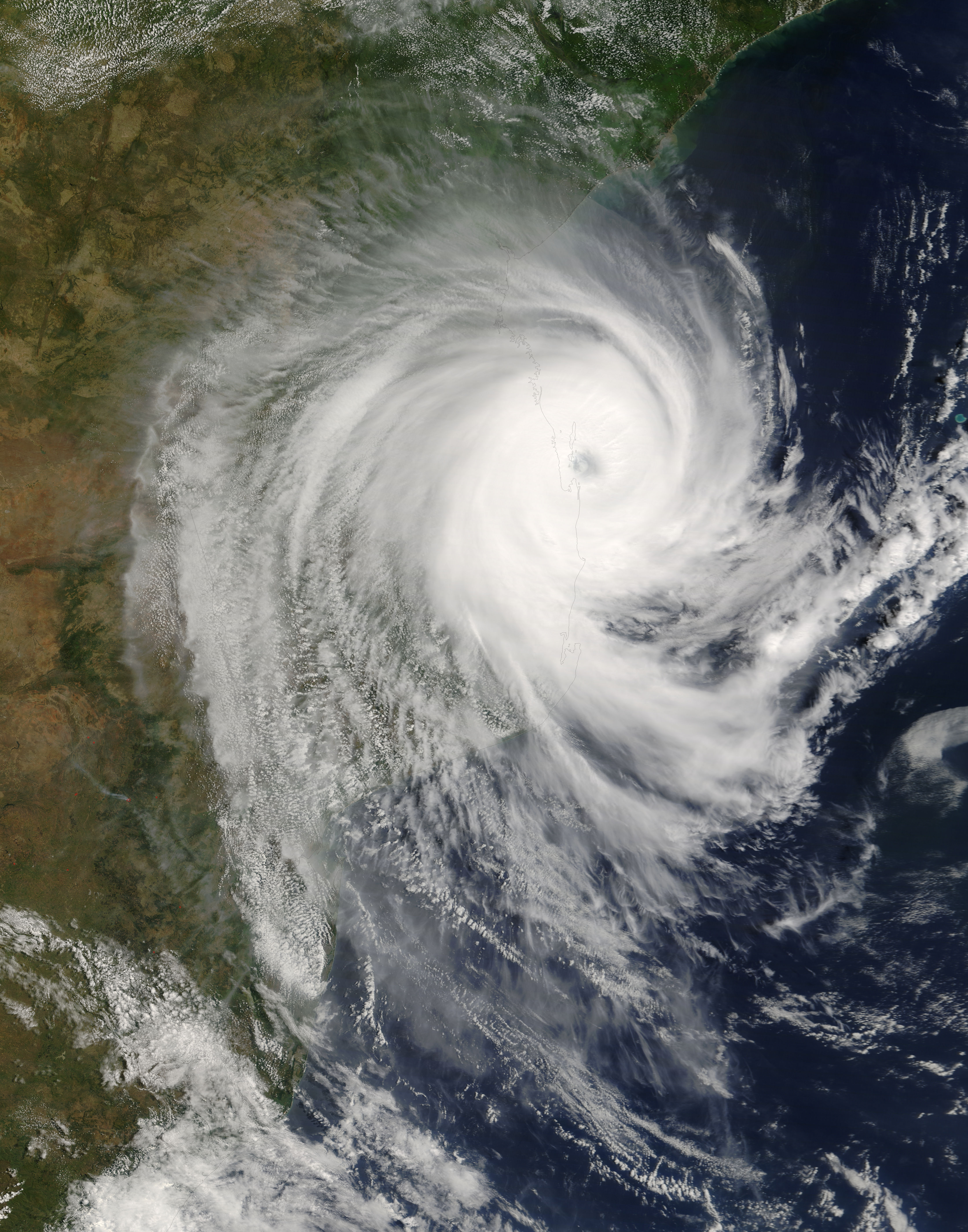
Cyclone Favio at landfall in Mozambique.

Upon becoming a hurricane, thunderstorm activity began to develop around an eye. Favio turned west-northwest, traversing the Mozambique Channel while beginning to deepen. At 00:00 UTC 20 February, the JTWC declared that Favio had intensified into a Category 2 hurricane-equivalent on the SSHWS. Several hours later, Favio was then upgraded into an intense tropical cyclone by MFR as the system developed a very small eye. Simultaneously, Cyclone Favio was upgraded into a Category 3 hurricane on the SSHWS via the JTWC. During the afternoon hours of 20 February, the JTWC reported that Favio had developed winds equivalent to Category 4 intensity. That evening, MFR noted that Cyclone Favio had peaked in intensity, with winds of 120 mph (195 km/h), becoming the most intense tropical cyclone south of the 25th parallel over the Mozambique Channel since the satellite era began. Six hours later, the JTWC announced that Favio had peaked in intensity, with 140 mph (225 km/h) winds. This made Favio equal to a mid-level Category 4 hurricane. At the time of its peak, Favio had developed a well-defined eye.

Shortly after its peak, Cyclone Favio began to weaken; the core of the storm started to become disrupted on the northwestern quadrant. The JTWC expected Favio to continue to weaken, and dissipate within 48 hours over land. The eye disappeared off of satellite imagery, though by the early hours of 22 February, this feature had re-developed. That afternoon, the storm was estimated to have made landfall in southern Mozambique. At that time, the JTWC reported winds of 105 mph (170 km/h), a Category 2 system on the SSHWS. On the other hand, MFR estimated winds of 105 mph (170 km/h) (an intense tropical cyclone). Upon making landfall, it did so on the seventh anniversary of the last intense tropical cyclone, Eline, to strike Mozambique. Favio was also the first tropical cyclone to hit the country since Cyclone Japhet did during the 2002–03 South-West Indian Ocean cyclone season. By early 23 February, the winds had dropped below hurricane-force according to the JTWC, while the storm dissipated later that day. Around that time, MFR stopped monitoring the system as well.

== Preparations ==
Prior to the arrival of Favio, flooding swept over Mozambique weeks earlier, forcing 163,000 persons to seek shelter. The floods started in late December 2006 when the Cahora Bassa Dam overflowed its banks. The floods escalated in February 2007 when the Zambezi River broke its banks, flooding the surrounding areas in Mozambique. A total of 80,600 people were evacuated from their homes in the Tete, Manica, Sofala and Zambezia provinces on 14 February. Twenty-nine people were confirmed dead due to the pre-Favio flood.

While at peak intensity, the storm threatened Mozambique and forcing authorities to put the country on high alert. The British Foreign Office also issued a travel warning to Britons who were planning visits along the Bazaruto Archipelago. Additionally, the South African disaster management team was on full alert in the eastern portion of Mpumalanga. In addition, thousands of volunteers were placed on stand by.

Some residents of Vilankulo attempted to flee the area carrying belongings and children as the government urged residents to seek shelter on higher ground further inland before the storm hit. They evacuated many of the people who remained, taking them to tent camps. Officials said that Favio could also bring heavy rains to Zambia, Malawi and Zimbabwe. Authorities in the latter issued a flood warning. Because of the topography of the region, meteorologists noted the potential for flooding in Zimabawe.

== Impact ==
=== Madagascar ===
While intensifying, Cyclone Favio brushed the southern tip of Madagascar while bringing heavy rains to the nation. Along the southeastern portion of the nation, road access was reduced. Favio disrupted relief operations to 582,000 people, who were struggling to cope with a drought in the southern portion of the nation. Moreover, the cyclone disrupted relief efforts during an aftermath of flood that killed three persons and displaced 33,000 people throughout the country. Overall, the cyclone was one of several storms to affect the nation during the season.

=== Mozambique ===
Map of Mozambique

About 130,000 homes suffered damage and 130 schools were leveled by the intense tropical cyclone in Mozambique. In all, a total of ten people were killed by the storm and nearly 100 others were injured. Combined with an earlier flood, Favio caused $71 million (2007 USD) in infrastructural damage. About 64,000 people moved to tents during the storm, and 33,000 people were displaced during the storm. Cyclone Favio destroyed 277,000 ha (684,480 acres) of crops, primarily in Vilanculos, Inhassoro, Govuro, and Masinga districts in Inhambane Province. Overall, 160,000 people were affected by the storm.

Favio damaged the court in the resort town of Vilanculos in Southern Mozambique. Uprooted trees caused by the cyclone also blocked roads, cutting off access for rescuers to some homes. Power was also cut off to the city. The cyclone killed four people and injured at least 70 in the town, and thousands of homes were destroyed along with the hospital, where a total of 120 patients were evacuated. Additionally, 600 prisoners escaped when the local jail was demolished. About 80% of the town was destroyed. A total of 73,000 people were affected by the cyclone in Vilanculos.

Elsewhere, the storm damaged trees and blew off rooftops in Pontagea, a highly populated suburb in the port city of Beira. Cyclone Favio was responsible for widespread damage in Tofo Beach, where the storm uprooted palm trees and destroyed electric services. Elsewhere, an airplane was crushed in an airport.

=== Elsewhere ===
In its formative stages, Favio dropped beneficial rainfall on Rodrigues island, reaching 217.6 mm (8.57 in) at Port Sud Est. Wind gusts on the island reached 114 km/h (71 mph).

In Zimbabwe, the Bvumba Mountains received heavy winds and rain. Throughout the country, damage was minimal and was mostly due to the uprooting of trees and not nearly as bad as Cyclone Leon–Eline, which devastated the nation seven years prior. However, electricity supplies were severely damaged. In one location, 400 wooden electricity poles were knocked down. Alongside moist air from the Intertropical Convergence Zone, Favio produced significant rains across much of Malawi, peaking at 121.7 mm (5 in) in Mimosa. Furthermore, the remnants of the low struck southern Tanzania. Cyclone Favio also destroyed 56 houses in Hai.

== Aftermath ==
During the aftermath of the storm, South Africa offered helicopters to Mozambique to deliver food to shelters and to help Mozambican officials assess the situation aerially. The disaster management minister of South Africa flew into Mozambique to survey the damage. Due to the concern for potential disease epidemics including those of malaria and cholera, health officials raised public awareness through theaters and radio. A joint coalition of the United States Agency for International Development and the Office of Foreign Disaster Assistance provided $626,500, enabling transportation of 50,000 mosquito nets to the devastated area. Oxfam International distributed 18,000 L (4,800 US gal) of clean water per day for 15,000 displaced people in the Caia and Marromeu districts and housed 8,000 residents in Chupanga, where they also distributed 5,500 bars of soap, more than 3,000 mosquito nets, and 1,600 buckets. The agency also built 50 baths and over 180 latrines. In Calia, Oxfam also distributed 1,400 nets. Marromeu was also supplied 900 mosquito nets via Calia. The agency also agreed to provide drinking water to the victims of Favio for four months.

The nation's president flew into the destructed area, lifting survivors' spirits. Within 48 hours following Intense Tropical Cyclone Favio, roofs were being repaired, and power lines were gradually being restored. Hundreds of local red cross staff and volunteers were utilized; they worked around the clock to assist survivors. Thirty-one recovery centers opened, hosting 400 first aid volunteers. According to a South African website, the government was praised for how well and quickly they handled the crisis. Key food items (rice, beans, corn meal, cooking oil, soap, and sugar) were distributed to the affected areas. On March 5, a plan was launched to provide victims for a total of $71 million worth of aid, of which $773,000 was expected to be directed towards the health. Meanwhile, water levels began to recede throughout the affected region. Moreover, a total of 28,000 lb (12,700 kg) of aid were distributed through the central part of the nation, and provided clean water for 6,000 people. About 200 tents were provided for victims whose roofs of their homes were blown off. Furthermore, concerns rose about the potential outbreak of diseases like HIV. Within three months after the cyclone, 85% of homes had used the aid they were given.

== See also ==
- Tropical cyclones in 2007
- Cyclone Filao (1989)
- Cyclone Leon–Eline (2000)
- Cyclone Japhet (2003)
