= Cyclone Bondo =

South-West Indian cyclone in 2006

Intense Tropical Cyclone Bondo
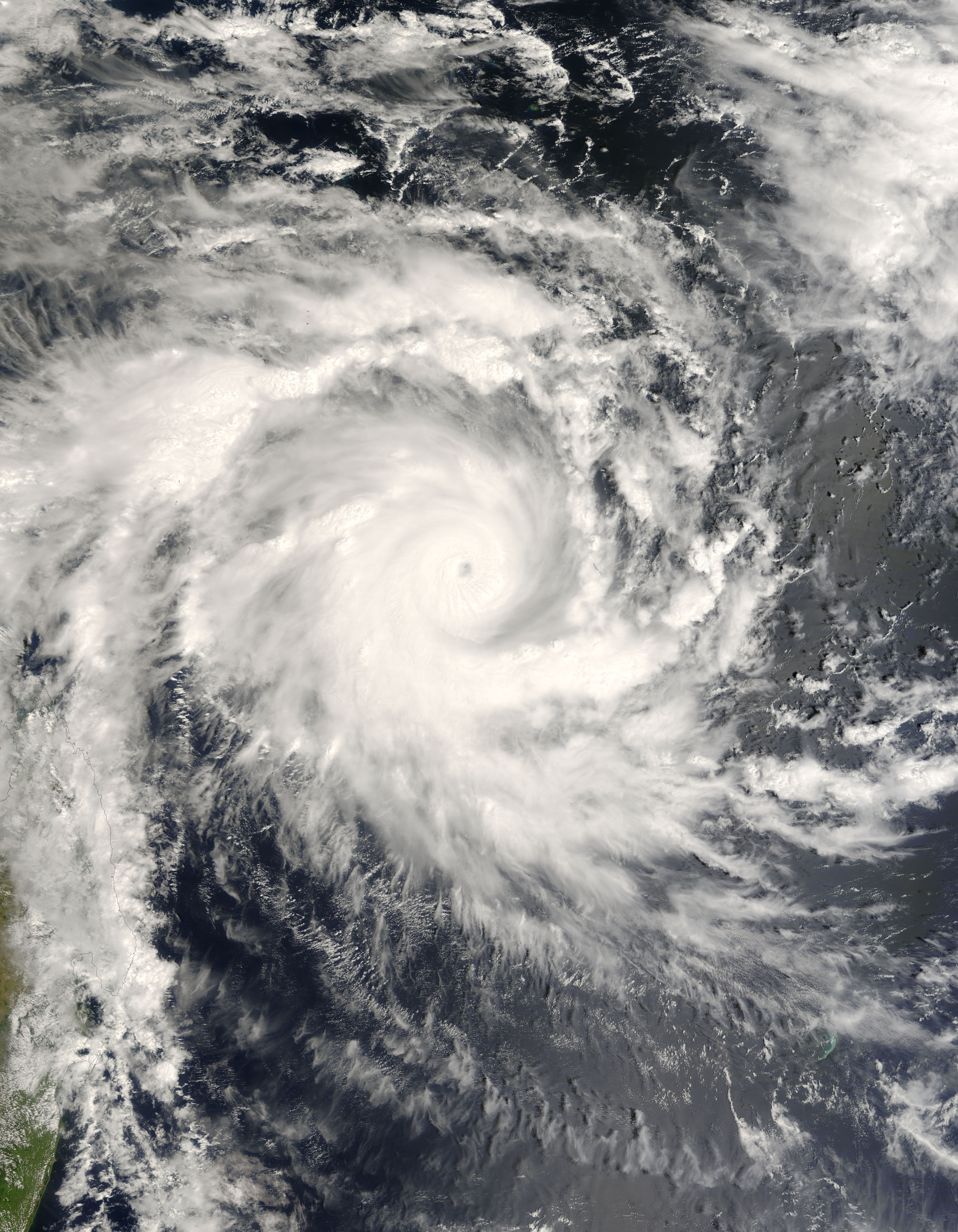
- Intense Tropical Cyclone Bondo on 20 December

Meteorological history
- Formed: 15 December 2006
- Dissipated: 28 December 2006

Intense tropical cyclone
- 10-minute sustained (MFR)
- Highest winds: 205 km/h (125 mph)
- Highest gusts: 285 km/h (180 mph)
- Lowest pressure: 930 hPa (mbar); 27.46 inHg

Category 4-equivalent tropical cyclone
- 1-minute sustained (SSHWS/JTWC)
- Highest winds: 250 km/h (155 mph)
- Lowest pressure: 904 hPa (mbar); 26.70 inHg

Overall effects
- Fatalities: 11
- Missing: 1
- Areas affected: Agaléga; Seychelles; Madagascar
- IBTrACS
- Part of the 2006–07 South-West Indian Ocean cyclone season

Intense Tropical Cyclone Bondo was the first of a series of six tropical cyclones to impact Madagascar during the 2006–07 South-West Indian Ocean cyclone season. Bondo developed on 15 December in the central Indian Ocean, west of Diego Garcia. After strengthening into a moderate tropical storm on 18 December, the storm rapidly intensified while moving westward, taking advantage of favorable atmospheric conditions. Within 18 hours of being named, Bondo intensified to tropical cyclone status, or the equivalent of a minimal hurricane. The Météo-France office on Réunion (MFR) estimated peak 10-minute sustained winds of 205 km/h (125 mph), although the American-based Joint Typhoon Warning Center estimated stronger 1-minute winds of 250 km/h (155 mph). While near peak intensity, Bondo passed just south of Agaléga island, before weakening slightly and moving through the Farquhar Group of islands belonging to the Seychelles, becoming the strongest cyclone to affect that island group in decades. Bondo turned southwestward, and after brushing the northern coast of Madagascar, the cyclone made landfall near Mahajanga on 25 December. The storm continued southward, and was last tracked by the MFR on 28 December.

Due to its small size, Bondo's winds did not exceed 100 km/h (62 mph) on Agaléga, despite passing close by near peak intensity. In the Seychelles, Bondo severely damaged buildings and vegetation on Providence Atoll. High waves caused flooding elsewhere in the archipelago. In Madagascar, Bondo killed 11 people when it struck the island's west coast. The storm's high winds, reaching 155 km/h (96 mph) in Mahajanga, damaged buildings and left around 20,000 people homeless.

== Meteorological history ==
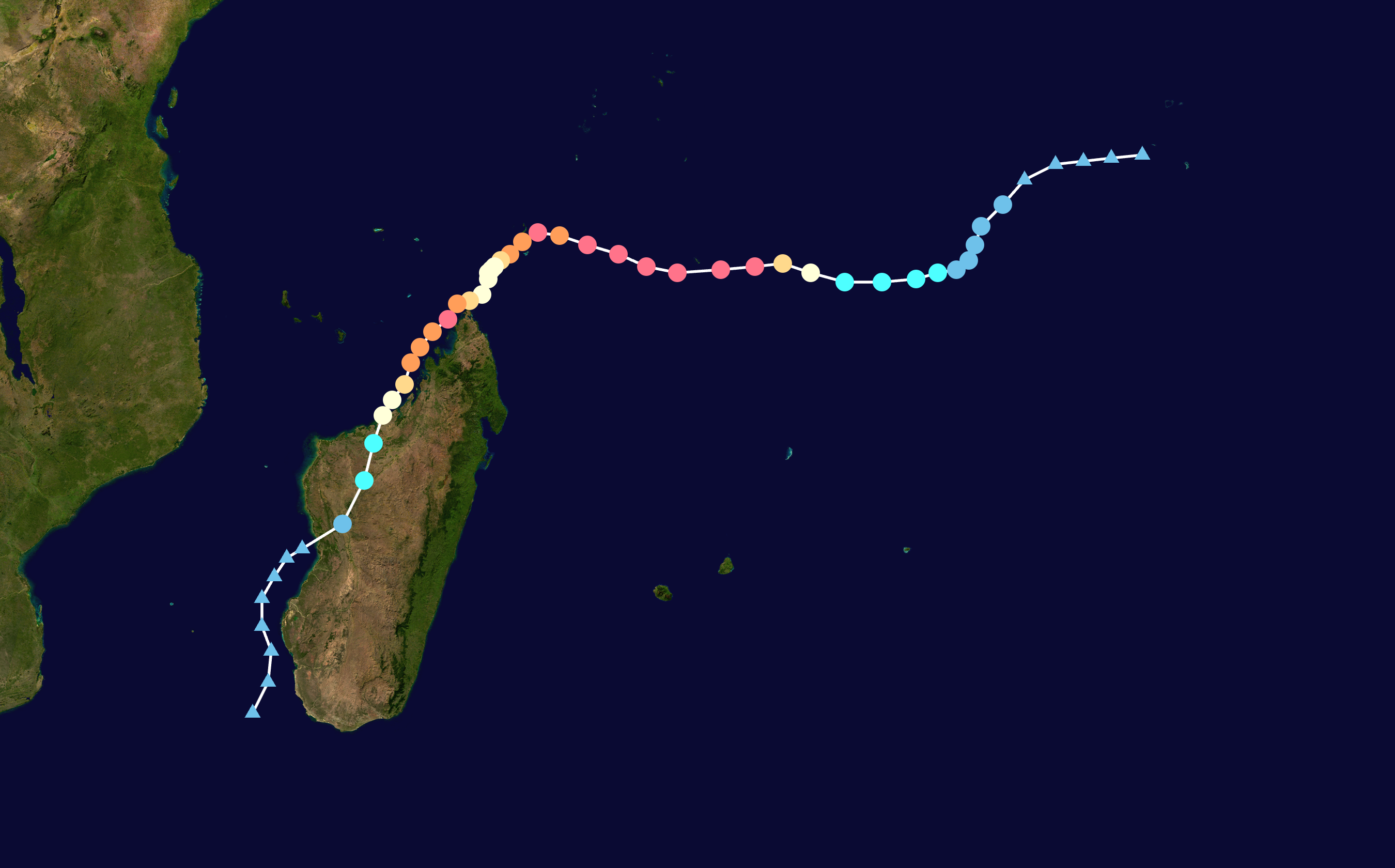
Map plotting the storm's track and intensity, according to the Saffir–Simpson scale Map key Saffir–Simpson scale Tropical depression (≤38 mph, ≤62 km/h) Tropical storm (39–73 mph, 63–118 km/h) Category 1 (74–95 mph, 119–153 km/h) Category 2 (96–110 mph, 154–177 km/h) Category 3 (111–129 mph, 178–208 km/h) Category 4 (130–156 mph, 209–251 km/h) Category 5 (≥157 mph, ≥252 km/h) Unknown Storm type Tropical cyclone Subtropical cyclone Extratropical cyclone, remnant low, tropical disturbance, or monsoon depression

An area of convection, or thunderstorms, persisted west of Diego Garcia in the central Indian Ocean on 15 December. That day, the Météo-France meteorological office in Réunion (MFR) (Note: Météo-France's meteorological office in Réunion (MFR) is the official Regional Specialized Meteorological Center for the South-West Indian Ocean, tracking all tropical cyclones from the east coast of Africa to 90° E.) classified the weather disturbance as Tropical Disturbance 3. Over the next two days, the disturbance became more organized, with increasing convection over the center. This was due to the system moving into an area of lower wind shear. On 18 December, the MFR upgraded the system to Moderate Tropical Storm Bondo. On the same day, the Joint Typhoon Warning Center (JTWC) (Note: The Joint Typhoon Warning Center (JTWC) is a joint United States Navy – United States Air Force task force that issues advisories for storms in the basin.) began issuing advisories on Bondo, designating it Tropical Cyclone 05S.

Steered by a ridge to the south, Bondo moved westward into an area conducive for strengthening, including low wind shear, warm waters of around 29 °C (84 °F), and favorable outflow. Within 18 hours of being named, Bondo intensified to tropical cyclone status, or the equivalent of a minimal hurricane, and continued to rapidly intensify. Late on 19 December, the JTWC estimated peak 1-minute winds of 250 km/h (155 mph). Early on 20 December, the MFR estimated peak 10-minute winds of 205 km/h (125 mph), making Bondo an intense tropical cyclone. At 02:30 UTC that day, Bondo passed about 20 km (12 mi) south of Agaléga, one of the Outer Islands of Mauritius. Despite the close approach at peak intensity, the cyclone's small size spared the strongest winds from affecting the island.

Increasing wind shear and an eyewall replacement cycle caused Bondo to weaken, beginning on 20 December. On the same day, the track shifted to the west-northwest. On 21 December, Bondo passed over Providence Atoll and Farquhar Atoll, part of the Outer Islands of Seychelles. It was the most intense tropical cyclone in several decades to strike that part of the Seychelles. On 22 December, Bondo weakened to a moderate tropical storm as its track shifted to the southwest. The storm re-intensified due to warmer waters, regaining tropical cyclone intensity late on 23 December near the northern tip of Madagascar. On the next day, the JTWC estimated a secondary peak intensity of 215 km/h (135 mph), while the MFR estimated a secondary peak of 140 km/h (85 mph). Land interaction and drier air caused the storm to weaken slightly. Around 12:00 UTC on 25 December, Bondo made landfall in northwestern Madagascar near Mahajanga as a severe tropical storm. The storm weakened to a tropical disturbance while continuing southward through the country. On 26 December, Bondo emerged into the Mozambique Channel. The MFR continued tracking the disturbance for two more days, by which point Bondo was located off the southwest coast of Madagascar.

== Preparations and impact ==
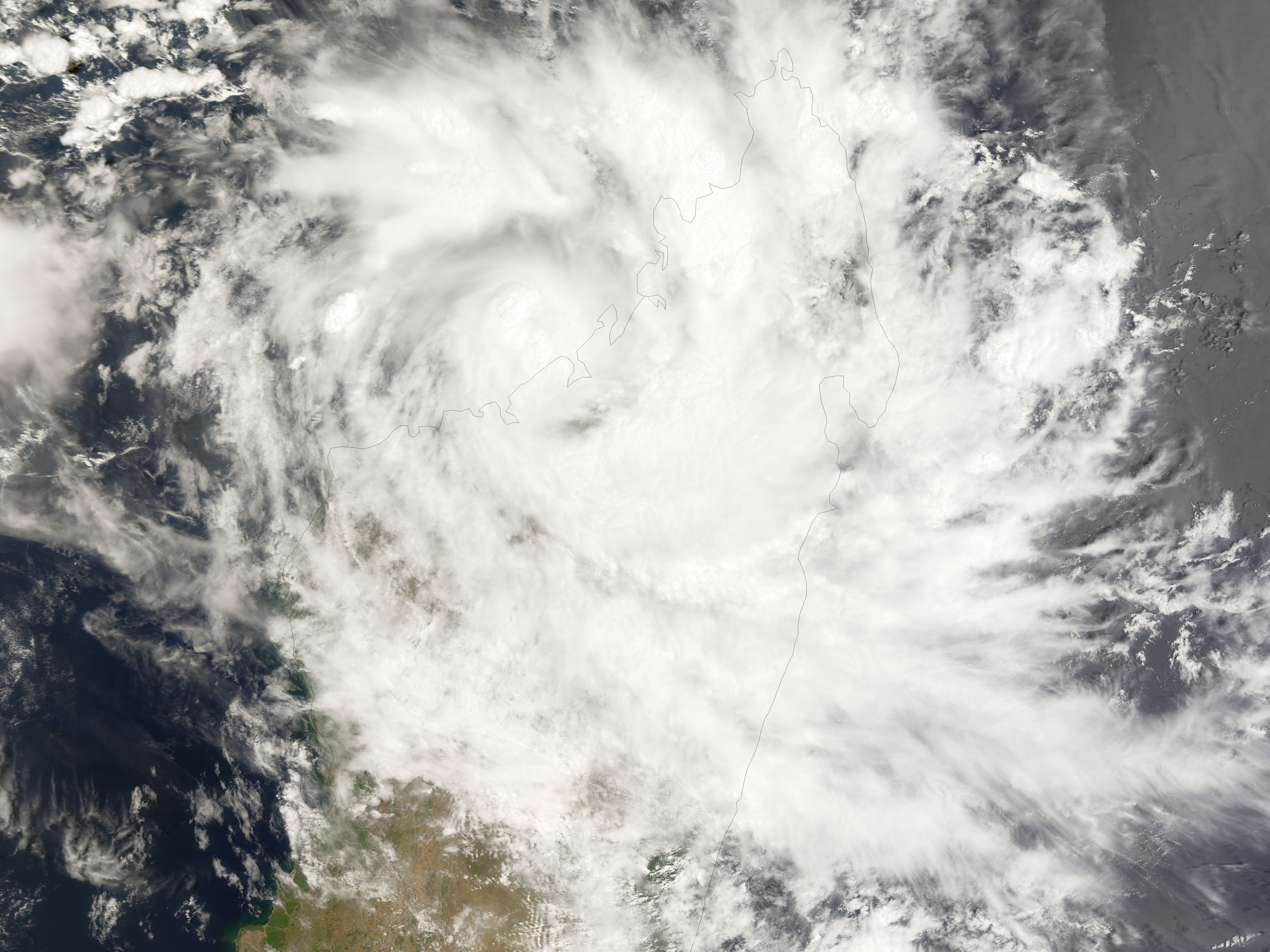
Cyclone Bondo nearing landfall in Madagascar on 25 December

Cyclone Bondo first affected the small island of Agaléga. The Mauritius Meteorological Service warned for the potential of storm surge, high winds, and heavy rainfall. While passing nearby, wind gusts did not exceed 100 km/h (62 mph). However, rainfall from the storm occurred on Agaléga, reaching about 287 mm (11.3 in) over 24 hours.

Due to its proximity to the equator, the Farquhar Atoll is rarely affected by tropical cyclones. Bondo was the first cyclone to affect Farquhar since Tropical Storm Honorine in 1974. The MFR described Bondo as "shaking the immemorial peacefulness of the islets of the Farquhar Archipelago and wreaking havoc on the northernmost ones." On 21 December, officials in Seychelles evacuated 35 of its 43 residents. The remaining eight stayed on Providence Atoll in a concrete bunker, unable to be evacuated due to limited time and resources. Bondo destroyed most of the buildings and about 60% of the coconut trees on Providence, decimating the island's copra industry. The island's human population was evacuated following the storm and not returned, due to the inability for emergency evacuations. The storm killed native pigs, birds, hens, and cats on Providence, while also wrecking vegetation. The cyclone also produced 1.8 m (5.9 ft) tides higher than normal in the Inner Islands of Seychelles, along with 3 m (9.8 ft) waves. Rough seas caused flooding, beach erosion, and coastal damage on Mahé, Praslin, and La Digue. One person was injured on Mahé.

In northern Madagascar, Cyclone Bondo produced gusty winds and heavy rainfall. Eleven people were killed as a result of Bondo and another was reported as missing. A total of 20,001 people were left homeless. One of the fatalities took place in Mahajanga after a wall collapsed on a man. Another fatality occurred offshore after a man went missing while taking his family canoeing. Roughly 300 people were affected in the city of Mahajanga alone. The city recorded 179 mm (7.0 in) of rainfall in 24 hours, as well as peak wind gusts of 155 km/h (96 mph). Bondo knocked out the power, water, and phone service in Mahajanga, hampering rescue efforts.

=== Aftermath ===
In the Seychelles, officials reinforced buildings to withstand future storm damage, following Cyclone Bondo. The improvements failed to withstand the winds from a stronger storm, Cyclone Fantala, which affected the same group of islands in 2016.

In conjunction with the International Red Cross, rescue teams in Madagascar were deployed to the hardest hit regions on 27 December. These teams traveled by road to the region while a third team was set to arrive by helicopter several days later. Bondo was the first in a series of six storms to affect Madagascar in the 2006-07 season, followed by Severe Tropical Storm Clovis, which struck southeastern Madagascar in January; Cyclones Favio and Gamede, which brushed the island in February, Indlala in March, and Jaya in April. In late-February, 2007, the Government of Norway provided $800,000 in relief funds for the combined effects of Cyclones Bondo, Favio and Clovis. On 15 March, the United Nations announced a funding program after three other storms had struck Madagascar. The goal was to provide roughly $9 million to about 300,000 of the millions of affected population. However, upon the announcement, only $3 million of this fund had been allocated. Following the widespread damage from Cyclone Indlala in March, 2007, the Government of Madagascar launched an appeal to the United Nations for $246 million in relief funds for damage wrought by all five cyclones. The appeal ultimately raised 76% of its target, which was spent on food, shelter, and other emergency items.

== See also ==
- Cyclone Kamisy (1983) – another strong cyclone that also affected northern and northwestern Madagascar
