= Mauritius Meteorological Services =

- Established: 1968 (58 years ago)
- Types: meteorological service organization
- Headquarters: Vacoas-Phoenix
- Country: Mauritius
- Coordinates: 20°17′51″S 57°29′49″E
- Website: metservice.intnet.mu

The Mauritius Meteorological Services (MMS) is the institution responsible for meteorological monitoring in Mauritius, established in 1968. It is a member of the World Meteorological Organization (WMO) and operates under the direction of the Ministry of Local Government and Disaster Risk Management.

== Mission and Objectives ==
The mission of the MMS is to provide accurate and timely meteorological and climate services, as well as early warnings for natural disasters, in order to bolster the socio-economic development of the Republic of Mauritius.

The strategic objectives of the MMS are:

- To build a weather-resilient nation
- To strengthen the network of observation stations and modernize operations
- To provide climate services for socio-economic development
- To enhance human and institutional capacities

== Activities ==
- Monitor weather and climate trends throughout the Republic of Mauritius, progression of tsunami waves and cyclonic activity in the southwestern Indian Ocean.
- Issue weather forecasts, advisories, and warnings for the populations of the country.
- Provide climate services.
- Fulfill the international obligations with the World Meteorological Organization, the Convention on International Civil Aviation Organization, and other regional and international obligations related to weather or climate.
