= Zita (disambiguation) =

Saint Zita (c. 1212–1272) is an Italian saint.

Zita may refer to:

- Zita (name), primarily a feminine given name
- Zita, Texas, an unincorporated community, United States
- Zita, originally Vinter-Palatset, the oldest movie theater in the city of Stockholm which is still in operation today.
- František Zíta (1909–1977), Czech chess master
- 689 Zita, a minor planet
- Tropical Storm Zita (1997), affecting southern China, Hong Kong, Vietnam and Laos
- Tropical Storm Zita, in the 2006–07 South Pacific cyclone season
- USS Zita (SP-21), a patrol vessel that served in the United States Navy during World War I
- Zita the Spacegirl, the titular main character in a series of graphic novels by Ben Hatke
- Alternative transliteration of Zeta

== See also ==
- Zeta (disambiguation)
