= Ʒ (disambiguation) =

Ʒ may refer to:

- Ezh (Ʒ, ʒ), a letter
- Dram (unit), a unit of mass
- Voiced palato-alveolar fricative
- 3 (number)

== See also ==
- 3 (disambiguation)
- Z (disambiguation) (Latin Z/z)
- Zeta (disambiguation) (Greek ζ/Ζ)
- Ǯ (Ezh with caron)
- Ze (Cyrillic) (З/з)
- Abkhazian Dze (Cyrillic Ӡ/ӡ)
- Yogh (Ȝ)
- Ƹ/ƹ (former IPA for ʕ; Latin ع (ayn), reversed ezh)
- EZH (disambiguation)
