= EZH =

Ezh (Ʒ, ʒ) is a letter in the extended Latin alphabet, a variant of the Z/z with a tail

Ezh or variation, may also refer to:

== Biology ==
- Enhancer of zest homologue, an enzyme family (EZH) and its related gene family (ezh)
  - EZH1, an enzyme and gene
  - EZH2, a histone-lysine N-methyltransferase enzyme
    - Ezh2 gene

== Linguistics ==
- Ezh symbols
  - Curly-tail ezh (◌̡_)
  - D-ezh ligature (ʤ)
  - Ezh with caron (Ǯ/ǯ)
  - Ezh reversed (Ƹ/ƹ)
  - L-ezh ligature (ɮ)

== Industry ==
- Ezh missile, a variant of the Buk missile system
- Electriciteitsbedrijf Zuid-Holland (EZH), a subsidiary of PreussenElektra

== See also ==
- Ʒ (disambiguation)
