= Cyclone Xavier (2006) =

Category 4 South Pacific cyclone

Severe Tropical Cyclone Xavier
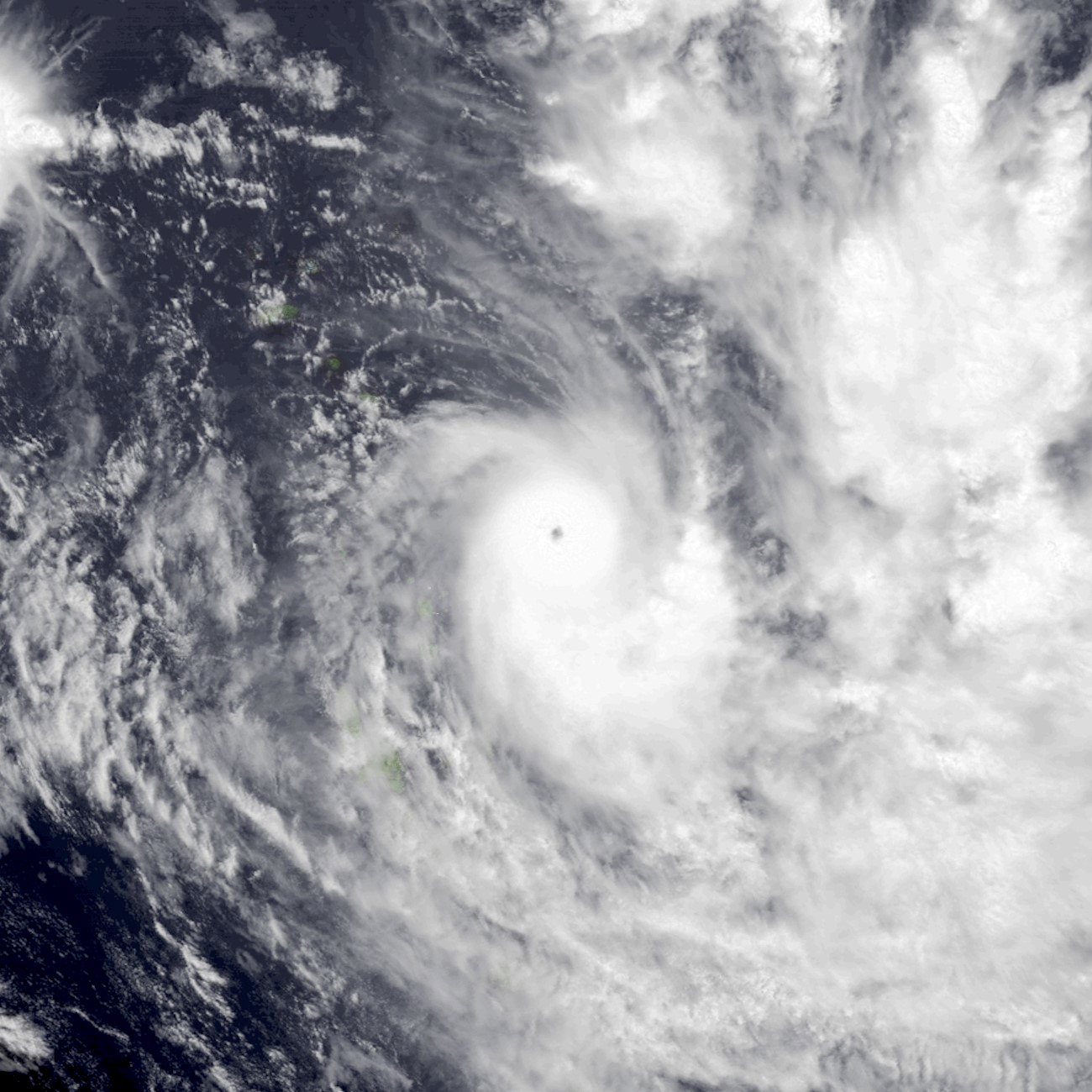
- Severe Tropical Cyclone Xavier at its peak intensity.

Meteorological history
- Formed: October 20, 2006
- Dissipated: October 26, 2006

Category 4 severe tropical cyclone
- 10-minute sustained (FMS)
- Highest winds: 175 km/h (110 mph)
- Lowest pressure: 930 hPa (mbar); 27.46 inHg

Category 4-equivalent tropical cyclone
- 1-minute sustained (SSHWS/JTWC)
- Highest winds: 215 km/h (130 mph)
- Lowest pressure: 927 hPa (mbar); 27.37 inHg

Overall effects
- Fatalities: None reported
- Damage: Minimal
- Areas affected: Vanuatu, Solomon Islands
- IBTrACS
- Part of the 2006–07 South Pacific cyclone season

Severe Tropical Cyclone Xavier was a strong pre-season cyclone that formed on October 20, 2006, to the north of the Santa Cruz Islands. Cyclone Xavier was also the strongest storm of the season. During the next day it rapidly developed and was designated as Tropical Depression 01F later that day, before being designated as Tropical Cyclone Xavier while over Santa Cruz early on October 22. Later on October 22, Xavier intensified into a category 3 severe tropical cyclone on the Australian Tropical Cyclone Intensity Scale, before passing over Tikopia early the next day. Xavier then reached its peak wind speeds of 175 km/h (110 mph 10-min), which made it a Category 4 cyclone early on October 24. Xavier stayed at its peak wind speeds until early the next day when it started to rapidly weaken, becoming a depression early on October 26. The remnants of Xavier persisted until October 28 before dissipating. There were no casualties reported as a result of the storm and little impact reported in the Solomon Islands and Vanuatu.

== Meteorological history ==
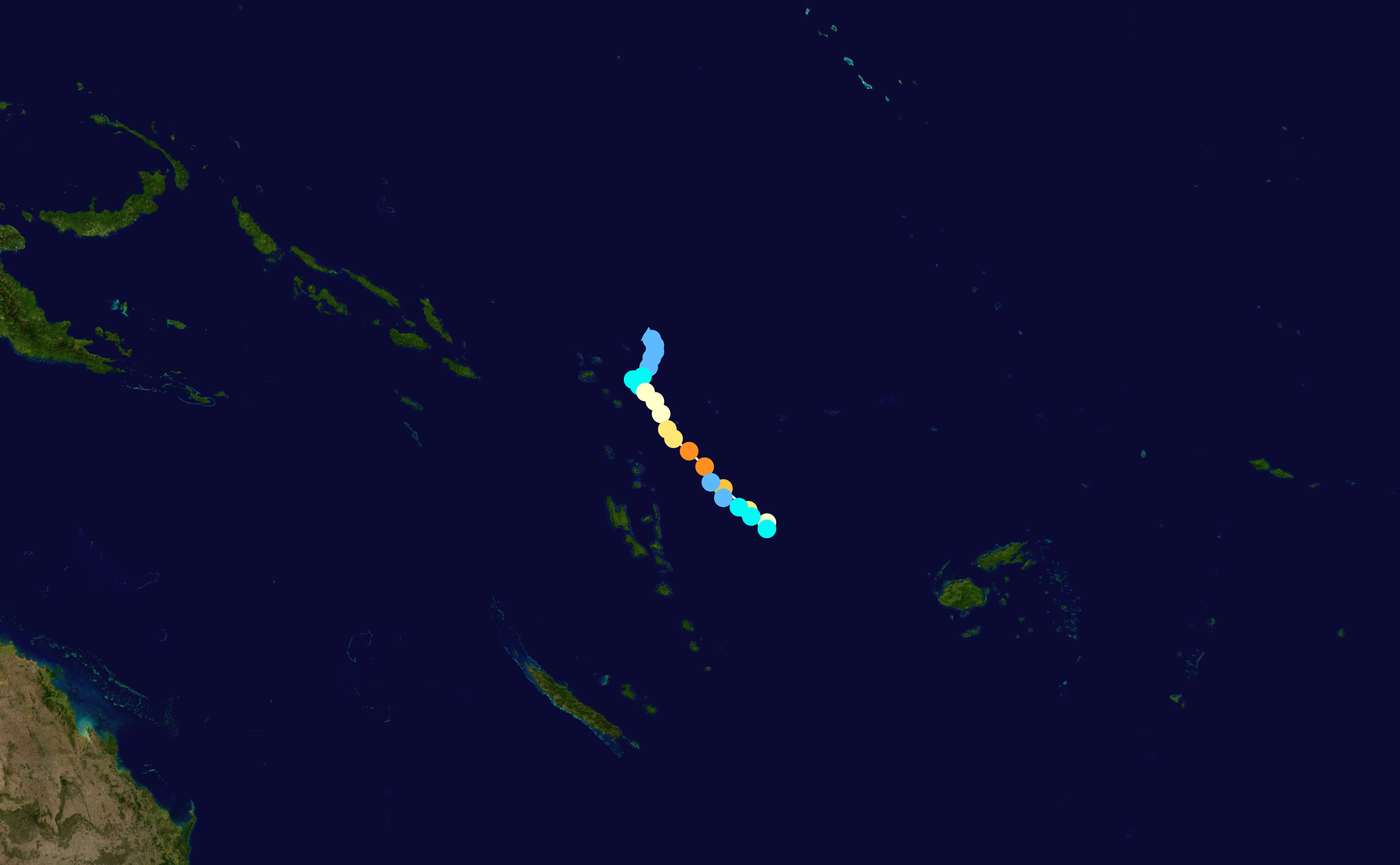
Map plotting the storm's track and intensity, according to the Saffir–Simpson scale Map key Saffir–Simpson scale Tropical depression (≤38 mph, ≤62 km/h) Tropical storm (39–73 mph, 63–118 km/h) Category 1 (74–95 mph, 119–153 km/h) Category 2 (96–110 mph, 154–177 km/h) Category 3 (111–129 mph, 178–208 km/h) Category 4 (130–156 mph, 209–251 km/h) Category 5 (≥157 mph, ≥252 km/h) Unknown Storm type Tropical cyclone Subtropical cyclone Extratropical cyclone, remnant low, tropical disturbance, or monsoon depression

During October 20, 2006 the Fiji Meteorological Service and the United States Joint Typhoon Warning Center started to monitor a tropical depression, that had developed within the South Pacific Convergence Zone to the north of Temotu Province in the Solomon Islands. The system was located within an area of low to moderate vertical wind shear and had a good outflow in its northern and eastern quadrants. Over the next day conditions surrounding the system rapidly became favourable for further development, with convection starting to wrap into a well defined low level circulation centre. As a result, the depression rapidly developed further and was named Xavier by the FMS during October 22, after it had become a category 1 tropical cyclone on the Australian tropical cyclone intensity scale. After the system was named the JTWC initiated advisories on the system and designated it as Tropical Cyclone 01P, while it was located over the Santa Cruz Islands. Throughout October 22, Xavier's rapid intensification continued with it developing an eye feature and becoming a category 3 severe tropical cyclone. During that day the system performed a small cyclonic loop over Temotu Province and passed near or over the Santa Cruz Island of Tikopia.

The systems rapid intensification subsequently slowed down during October 23, as an upper-level anticyclone located to the northwest of the system impeded the systems outflow. The system also started to move south-eastwards during that day, as a trough of low pressure created a break in the ridge of high pressure that was steering Xavier. The FMS subsequently estimated during October 24, that the system had peaked as a Category 4 Severe Tropical Cyclone with 10-minute sustained wind speeds of 175 km/h (110 mph), while it was located about 220 km (135 mi) to the east of Vanua Lava in northern Vanuatu. The JTWC also estimated during October 24, that the system had peaked with 1-minute sustained wind speeds of 215 km/h (135 mph), which made it equivalent to a category 4 hurricane on the Saffir-Simpson hurricane wind scale. Over the next day the system maintained its peak intensity as it moved south-eastwards, before it turned westwards during the next day towards Vanuatu and rapidly weakened after it moved into an area of cooler sea-surface temperatures and strong vertical wind-shear. As a result, during October 26, The FMS and JTWC both reported that the system had weakened into a tropical depression, with the JTWC issuing their final advisory on the system as they expected it to dissipate within 12 hours. Xavier's remnants were last noted by the FMS during October 28, after the systems low level circulation centre was not able to be distinguished.

== Preparations and impact ==
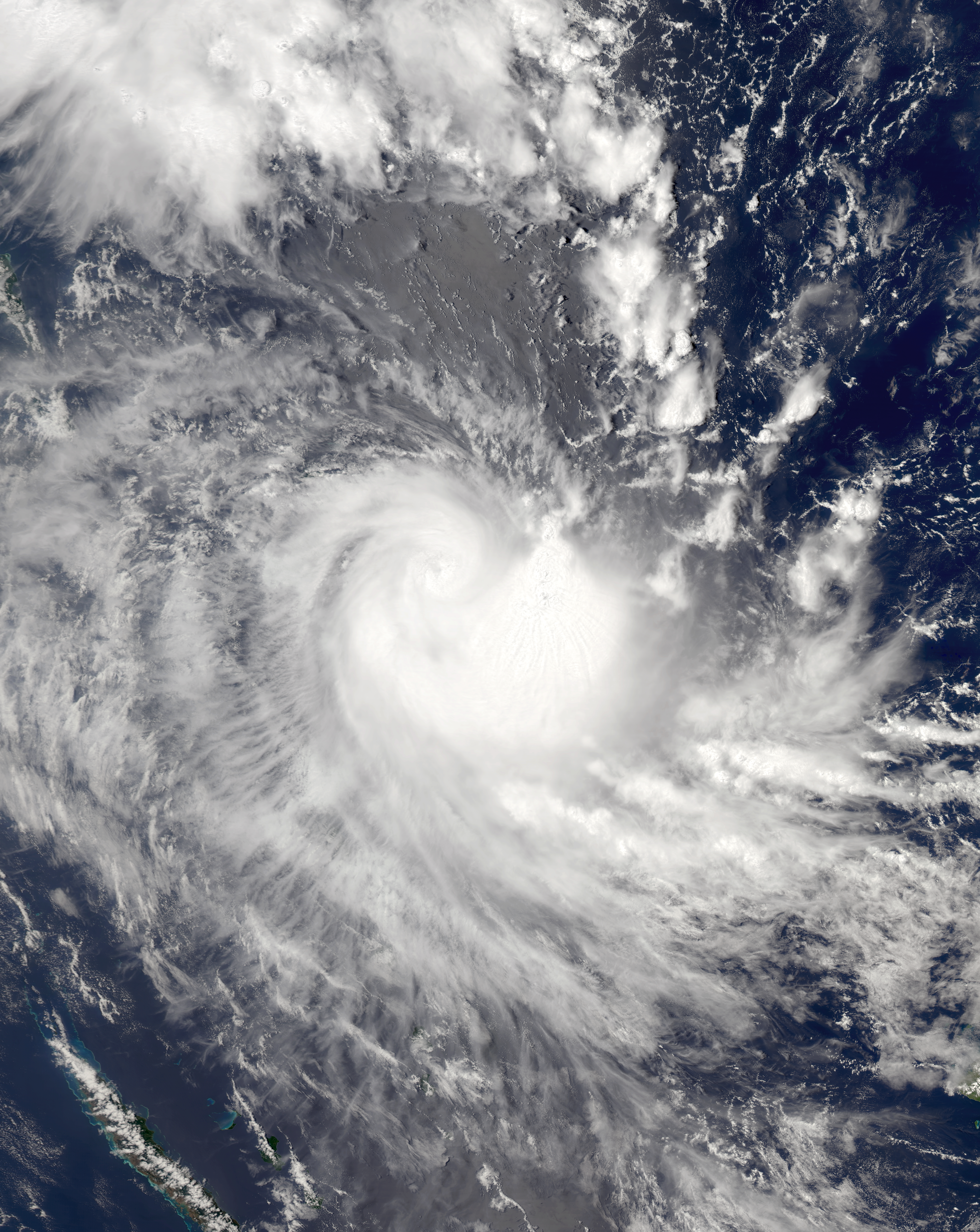
Cyclone Xavier strengthening on October 23

Early on October 22, both RSMC Nadi and TCWC Brisbane started to issue special advisories to support the meteorological services of Vanuatu and the Solomon Islands in tracking the cyclone. As Xavier was over the islands of Santa Cruz the whole of Temotu Province was placed under a tropical cyclone gale warning, while cyclone watches were declared for Rennel, Bellona, and Vanuatu. During the next 24 hours, the Torres and Banks Islands, as well as Espirito Santo, Maewo, Ambae, were placed under a cyclone warning. The warnings for the Solomon Islands were then cancelled early the next day, while the warnings for Vanuatu were maintained until late on October 25, when RSMC Nadi discontinued them.

There were no casualties as a result of Xavier. In the Solomon Islands, communications to the Temotu province were lost. When communications were restored on October 24, it was reported that there was only minor tree damage on the islands of Utupua and Vanikolo. On Tikopia, crops sustained damage, though the effects were considered light given the circumstances. Strong and gusty winds, rough seas and moderate to heavy swells were reported within the eastern Vanuatuan islands, however, no significant damage was reported within the islands.

== See also ==
- List of off-season South Pacific tropical cyclones
- Cyclone Namu
- Cyclone Lola (2023)
