= Zeta (disambiguation) =

Zeta (Ζ or ζ) is the sixth letter of the Greek alphabet.

Zeta or ZETA may also refer to:

== Manufacturing ==
- GM Zeta platform, a full-size car series
- Zeta (automobile), an Australian car produced by Lightburn

== Organizations ==
- FK Zeta, Montenegrin football club
- Grupo Zeta, Spanish media conglomerate
- Los Zetas, criminal drug cartel in Mexico
- Zeta Global, internet marketing firm
- Zeta (company), banking software company
- Motorcycle-mounted special operations branch of the Greek police

== People ==
- Zeta (name), list of people and fictional characters with the name

== Places ==
- Zeta Banovina, a province of the Kingdom of Yugoslavia between 1929 and 1941
  - Palace of Zeta Banovina
- Zeta (medieval region), a medieval region in southern parts of modern Montenegro and some northern parts of Albania
  - Zeta (crown land), a part of the medieval Serbian state, from the end of the 12th to the middle of the 14th century
  - Principality of Zeta, a medieval principality, from the middle of the 14th up to the end of the 15th century
- Zeta Plain, a plain in Montenegro
- Zeta (river), a river in Montenegro
- Zeta Municipality, a municipality in Montenegro
- Zeta, Missouri, a ghost town in the United States

== Science ==
- Zeta distribution, a discrete probability distribution
- ZETA (fusion reactor), the Zero-Energy Toroidal (or Thermonuclear) Assembly reactor, a British test facility
- Zeta (wasp) a genus of potter wasps
- Zeta pinch or Z-pinch, a type of plasma confinement system
- Zeta potential, the electrokinetic potential of a colloidal system
- Riemann zeta function, a function used in analytic number theory
- Zeta function, any of a number of functions analogous to the Riemann zeta function
- SARS-CoV-2 Zeta variant, one of the variants of SARS-CoV-2, the virus that causes COVID-19

== Video games ==
- Mothership Zeta, a location in Fallout 3
- Zeta Metroid, a type of Metroid from the Metroid franchise

== Other uses ==
- List of storms named Zeta
- ZETA (operating system), computer operating system
- Zeta, Baja California investigative journalism newsweekly
- Zéta, Hungarian wine grape
- USS Zeta, U.S. Navy ship
- Z, spoken as "zeta" in languages such as Spanish, Italian, and Swedish.

== See also ==
- Zetta-, a prefix in the SI system of units
- Zita (disambiguation)
