= 2006–07 South Pacific cyclone season =

Tropical cyclone season

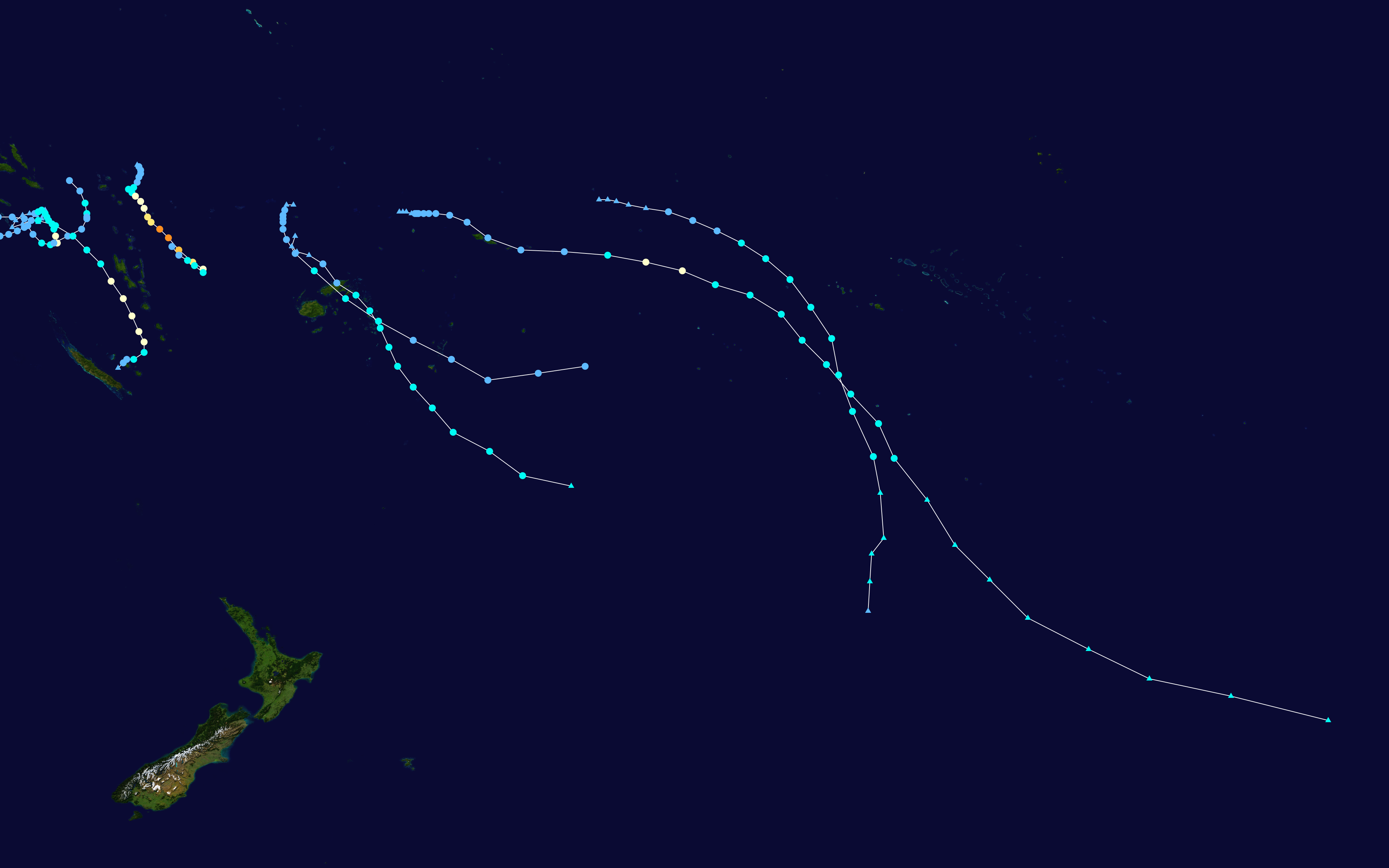
- Season summary map

Seasonal boundaries
- First system formed: October 20, 2006
- Last system dissipated: April 6, 2007

Strongest storm
- Name: Xavier
  - Maximum winds: 175 km/h (110 mph) (10-minute sustained)
  - Lowest pressure: 930 hPa (mbar)

Seasonal statistics
- Total disturbances: 15
- Total depressions: 12
- Tropical cyclones: 6
- Severe tropical cyclones: 2
- Total fatalities: Unknown
- Total damage: Unknown

Related articles
- 2006–07 South-West Indian Ocean cyclone season; 2006–07 Australian region cyclone season

The 2006–07 South Pacific cyclone season was an event in the annual cycle of tropical cyclone formation. It began on October 20, 2006 and ended on April 1, 2007. These dates conventionally delimit the period of each year when most tropical cyclones form in the southern Pacific Ocean east of 160°E. Additionally, the regional tropical cyclone operational plan defines a tropical cyclone year separately from a tropical cyclone season, and the "tropical cyclone year" runs from July 1, 2006 to June 30, 2007.

Tropical cyclones between 160°E and 120°W and north of 25°S are monitored by the Fiji Meteorological Service in Nadi. Those that move south of 25°S are monitored by the Tropical Cyclone Warning Centre in Wellington, New Zealand.

== Seasonal outlooks ==
| Source Record | Tropical Cyclone | Severe Tropical Cyclone | Ref |
|---|---|---|---|
| Record high: | 1997–98:16 | 1982–83:10 |
| Record low: | 2003–04: 3 | 1994–95: 1 |
| Activity during the season | 6 | 2 |

During September 2006, the Fiji Meteorological Service (FMS) reported that the development of a weak to moderate El Niño episode was likely which could push into the early months of 2007. As a result, the FMS predicted that the El Niño would have a significant effect on tropical cyclone frequency and distribution within the South Pacific basin and beyond during the upcoming season. They also predicted that the season could see an above average number of tropical cyclones occur, with a greater tendency for them to form near and east of the International Date Line. It was also predicted that a tropical cyclone may form during the early part of the season or during the pre season. The FMS also predicted that the island nations of Fiji, Tonga, Niue, Samoa and the Cook Islands, had a greater than normal chance of being affected by a tropical cyclone.

The FMS along with other Pacific Meteorological services including New Zealand's MetService and National Institute of Water and Atmospheric Research (NIWA) and the Australian Bureau of Meteorology contributed to the Island Climate Update tropical cyclone outlook that was released during October 2006. The outlook took into account the developing weak to moderate El Niño conditions that had been observed across the Pacific. The outlook called for an above average number of tropical cyclones to develop during the 2006–07 season, with ten tropical cyclones occurring on average between 135°E and 120°W during El Niño years. It was also noted that at least half of the tropical cyclones reach hurricane force and become Category 3 Severe Tropical Cyclones. The Island Climate Outlook predicted that the first tropical cyclone of the season could occur, before the end of November or about a month earlier than usual.

== Seasonal summary ==
The 2006–07 South Pacific cyclone season got off to an early start with a tropical disturbance developing into Cyclone Xavier, late on October 21. Xavier rapidly intensified and became a category three Severe Tropical Cyclone on the Australian tropical cyclone intensity scale during the next day. As a Severe Tropical Cyclone, Xavier passed over Tikopia and then continued to intensify and reached its peak wind speeds early on October 24. Xavier then rapidly weakened during the next day which led to the final advisories being issued on October 26. Whilst Xavier was active, Tropical Depression 02F formed on October 24 to the northeast of American Samoa. As the depression moved towards the west, it remained weak as it was badly affected by Cyclone Xavier's outflow, the final advisory was released on October 29. Early on November 1, Tropical Disturbance 03F formed to the northeast of Fiji. It was then upgraded to a Tropical Depression later that day. The depression then meandered around the International Date Line for a couple days without any significant development, with the final advisory being issued by RSMC Nadi early on November 3. Cyclone Yani formed as a weak tropical disturbance on November 16, it was upgraded into Tropical Depression 04F early the next day. Over the next few days the depression moved towards the west gradually developing until a Tropical Cyclone Formation Alert was issued late on November 21. Early the next day it was upgraded to Cyclone Yali by RSMC Nadi and designated as 02P by the JTWC, after being classified Yani started to intensify quite quickly becoming a Category three severe tropical cyclone early on November 23. Yali then reached its peak windspeeds later that day before starting to rapidly weaken early on November 24, as it entered an area of higher wind shear and was downgraded to a Tropical Depression later that day.

== Systems ==
=== Severe Tropical Cyclone Xavier ===
- Category 4 severe tropical cyclone (Australian scale)
- Category 4 tropical cyclone (SSHWS)
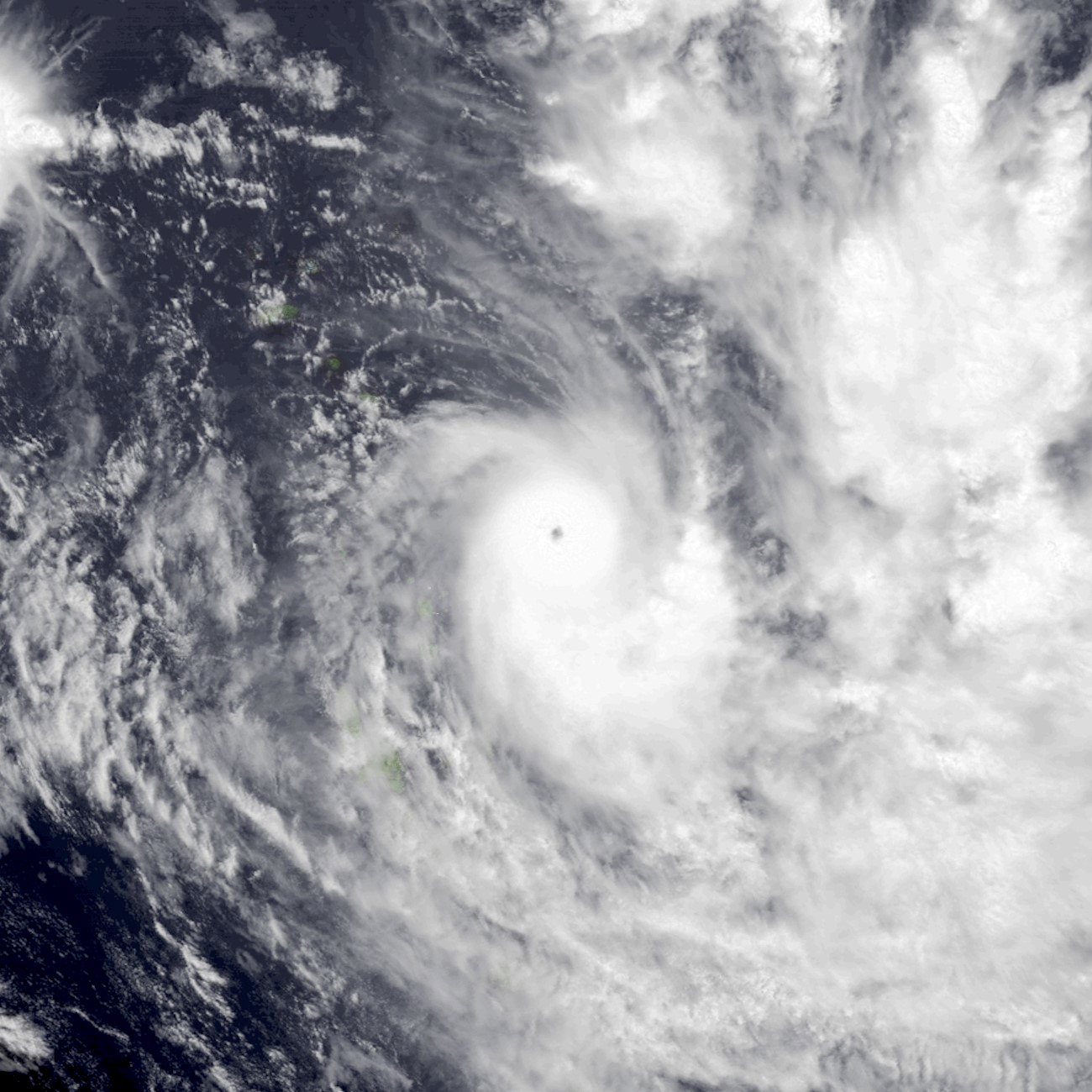
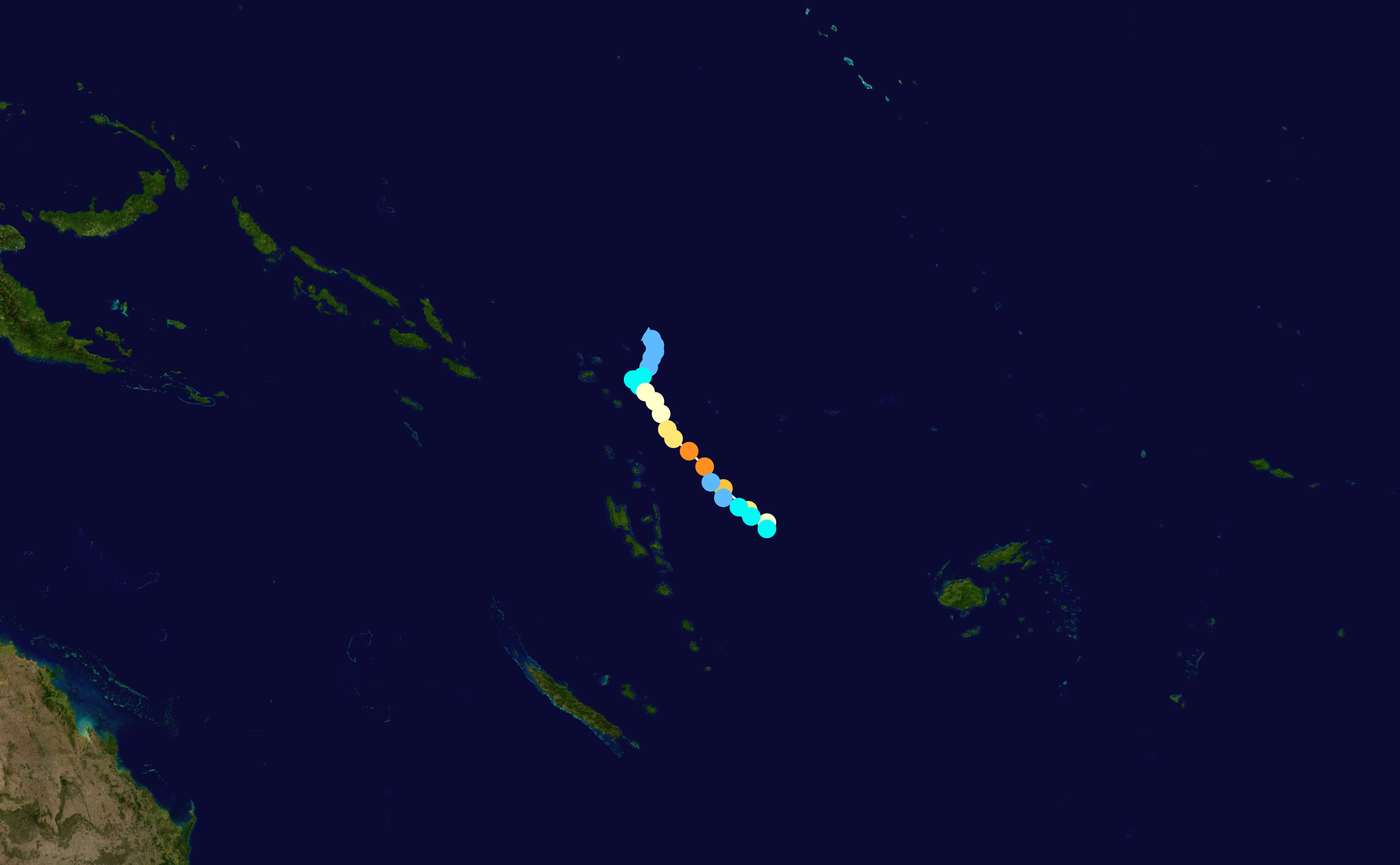
- Duration: October 20 – October 26
- Peak intensity: 175 km/h (110 mph) (10-min); 930 hPa (mbar)

During October 20, the JTWC and the FMS started to monitor a tropical depression, that had developed within the South Pacific Convergence Zone to the north of Temotu Province in the Solomon Islands. Over the next day conditions surrounding the system rapidly became favourable for further development, with convection starting to wrap into a well defined low level circulation centre. As a result, the depression rapidly developed further and was named Xavier by the FMS during October 22, after it had become a category 1 tropical cyclone on the Australian tropical cyclone intensity scale. After the system was named the JTWC initiated advisories on the system and designated it as Tropical Cyclone 01P, while it was located over the Santa Cruz Islands. Throughout October 22, Xavier's rapid intensification continued with it developing an eye feature and becoming a category 3 severe tropical cyclone. During that day the system performed a small cyclonic loop over Temotu Province and passed near or over the Santa Cruz Island of Tikopia. After passing near or over Tikopia the system started to move south-eastwards during that day, as a trough of low pressure created a break in the ridge of high pressure that was steering Xavier.

The FMS subsequently estimated during October 24, that the system had peaked as a Category 4 Severe Tropical Cyclone with 10-minute sustained wind speeds of 175 km/h (110 mph), while it was located about 220 km (135 mi) to the east of Vanua Lava in northern Vanuatu. The JTWC also estimated during October 24, that the system had peaked with 1-minute sustained wind speeds of 215 km/h (135 mph), which made it equivalent to a category 4 hurricane on the Saffir-Simpson hurricane wind scale. Over the next day the system maintained its peak intensity as it moved south-eastwards, before it turned westwards during the next day towards Vanuatu and rapidly weakened after it moved into an area of cooler sea-surface temperatures and strong vertical wind-shear. As a result, during October 26, The FMS and JTWC both reported that the system had weakened into a tropical depression, before the systems remnants were last noted by the FMS during October 28. On the Santa-Cruz Islands of Utupua and Vanikolo some minor tree damage was reported, while extensive damage to food crops occurred at Tikopia. However, Radio New Zealand reported that overall damage at Tikopia was considered to be light given the circumstances. Strong and gusty winds, rough seas and moderate to heavy swells were reported within the eastern Vanuatuan islands, however, no significant damage was reported within the islands.

=== Tropical Depression 02F ===
- Tropical depression (Australian scale)
- Duration: October 24 – October 29
- Peak intensity: Winds not specified; 1004 hPa (mbar)

During October 24, the FMS reported that the second tropical depression of the season had developed, within a trough of low pressure about 555 km (345 mi) to the northwest of American Samoa. Deep convection had persisted around the center however it was poorly organised with multiple low level circulation centers being reported with environmental shear around the system minimal. During the next day as it moved towards the west and crossed the International Date Line the depression lost all its deep convection. The low level circulation center had become difficult to locate as the depression was being influenced unfavorably by the outflow from Cyclone Xavier. As a result of the outflow the depression became separated from the southeasterly surge which had been helping to develop the system whilst the westerlies to the north of the system remained weak. The final advisory was then issued on October 29 by RSMC Nadi as the depression had completely dissipated.

=== Tropical Depression 03F ===
- Tropical depression (Australian scale)
- Duration: November 1 – November 3
- Peak intensity: Winds not specified; 1004 hPa (mbar)

Early on November 1, RSMC Nadi reported that Tropical Disturbance 03F, had developed to the northeast of Fiji, with multiple circulation centers. Later that day as the convection was now displaced to the north of the low level circulation center and the disturbance had become better organized it was designated as a tropical depression. The system then meandered around in the same general area for a couple days without any development until the final advisory was issued by RSMC Nadi early on November 3.

=== Severe Tropical Cyclone Yani ===
- Category 3 severe tropical cyclone (Australian scale)
- Category 1 tropical cyclone (SSHWS)
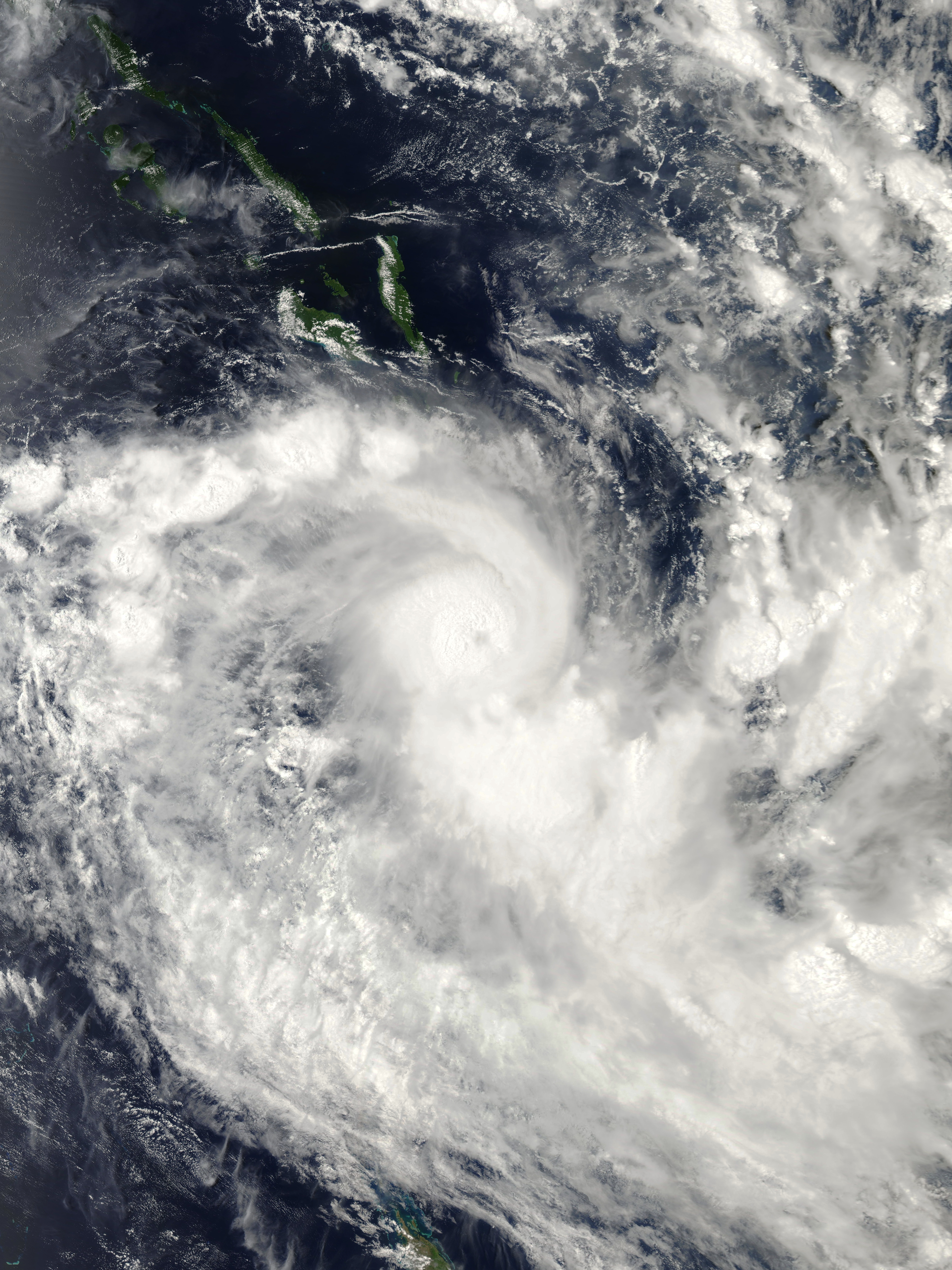
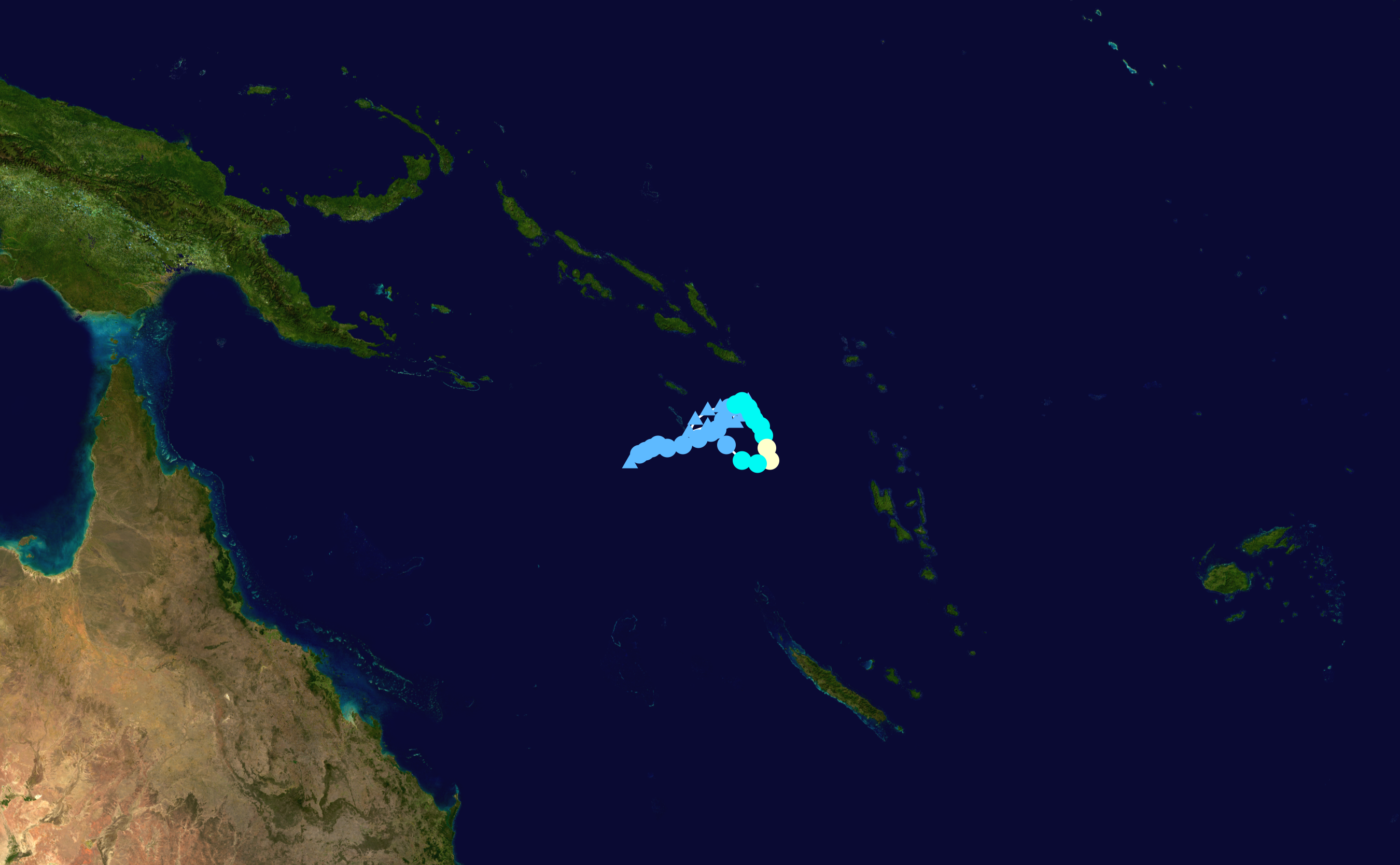
- Duration: November 16 – November 26
- Peak intensity: 140 km/h (85 mph) (10-min); 960 hPa (mbar)

Late on November 16 a weak tropical disturbance formed to the north-west of Tuvalu embedded within the South Pacific Convergence Zone. The disturbance did not have any organised convection near the low level circulation centre and was located in an area of low vertical wind shear. Early the next day whilst the organisation of the system had not improved much, there had been enough of an increase in convection in the northern and southern quadrants for RSMC Nadi to designate the disturbance as Tropical Depression 04F. Over the next couple of days the depression gradually moved towards the south-west before the low level circulation center was relocated to the north of Vanuatu early on November 19. The depression continued to gradually develop, with a Tropical Cyclone Formation Alert being issued late on November 21 as convection had erupted about the low level circulation centre with bands of convection wrapping around the low level circulation significantly.

The depression was then upgraded to a category one tropical cyclone on the Australian Tropical Cyclone Intensity scale early on November 22, with the name Yani being assigned. The JTWC also upgraded Yani to a tropical cyclone whilst the cyclone was located approximately 425 km, (265 miles), to the southeast of Honiara, in the Solomon Islands. Yani then intensified fairly rapidly, being upgraded to a category two cyclone later that day while an eye was noted to be beginning to form. Yani was then upgraded to a category three severe tropical cyclone early the next day as an eye became established. Later that day, Yani then reached its peak pressure of 960 hPa and its peak windspeeds of 140 km/h (85 mph) (10-min) and 130 km/h (80 mph) (1-min). Yani maintained its peak intensity until early on November 24, when the storm began to weaken under the force of strengthening shear that tore away its low level circulation centre and was downgraded to a Tropical Depression by RSMC Nadi later that day. The JTWC then issued their final advisory early the next day whilst RSMC Nadi kept issuing advisories until late on November 26 as the depression moved into TCWC Brisbane's area of responsibility. The JTWC later reported that it had dissipated that day.

=== Tropical Depression 05F ===
- Tropical depression (Australian scale)
- Tropical storm (SSHWS)
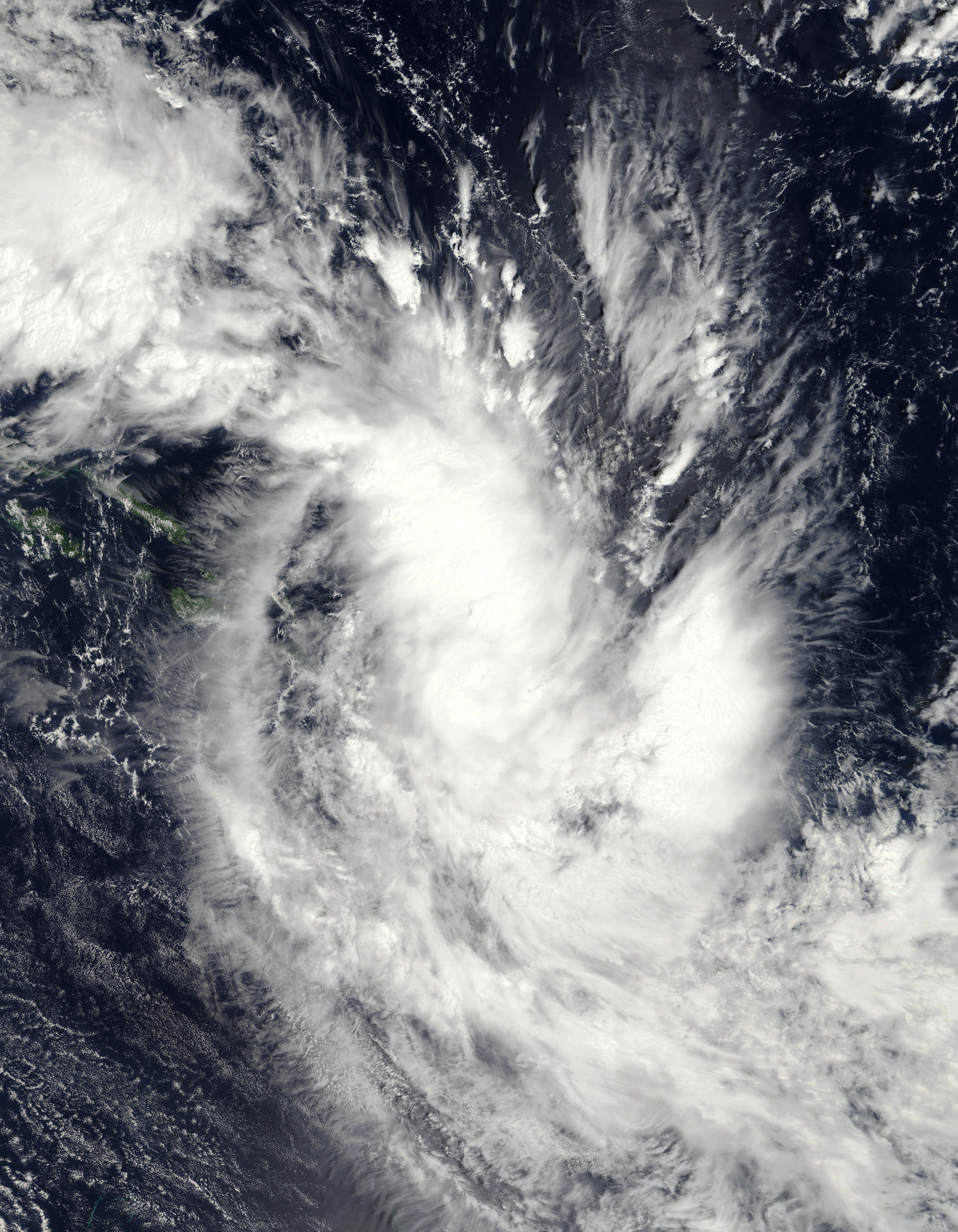
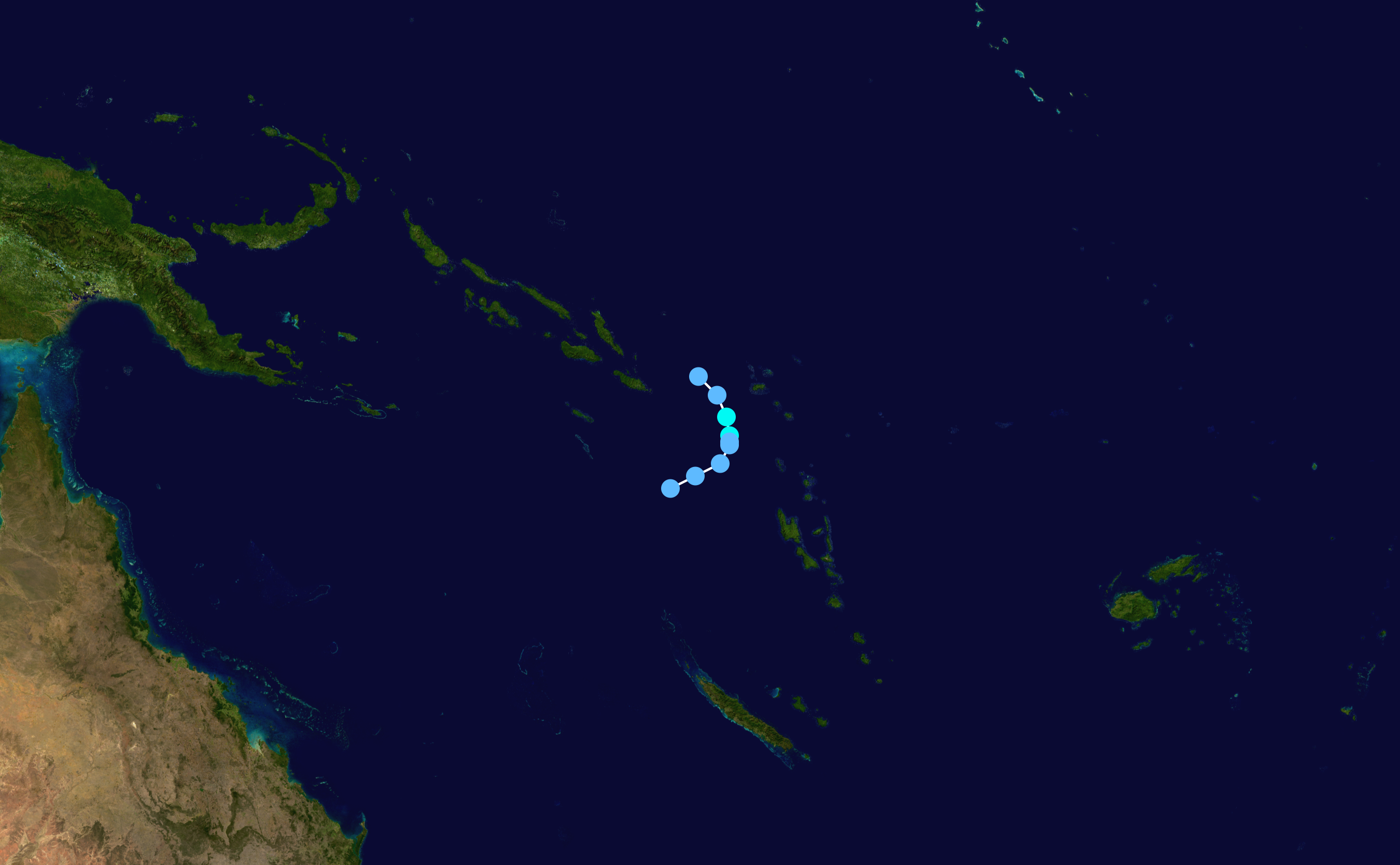
- Duration: November 29 – December 4
- Peak intensity: 55 km/h (35 mph) (10-min); 997 hPa (mbar)

An area of disturbed weather developed east-northeast of the Solomon Islands on November 28. RSMC Nadi began monitoring it as a tropical disturbance early on November 29 as it moved westward in a favorable environment for development. The disturbance later that day was classified as a tropical depression. On November 30, the Joint Typhoon Warning Center initiated advisories on the storm, internally numbered Tropical Cyclone 04P. Under heavy wind shear, the storm never developed further and the JTWC stopped advisories on December 1, shortly after RSMC Nadi.

=== Tropical Depression 06F ===
- Tropical depression (Australian scale)
- Duration: January 9 – January 17
- Peak intensity: 55 km/h (35 mph) (10-min); 1000 hPa (mbar)

On January 9 RSMC Nadi identified a tropical depression well east of the International Date Line, located in a sheared environment, with convection having persisted for 24 hours. It never developed further and late on January 15 RSMC Nadi noted that 06F had become extratropical. RSMC Nadi last noted it two days later.

=== Tropical Cyclone Zita ===
- Category 2 tropical cyclone (Australian scale)
- Tropical storm (SSHWS)
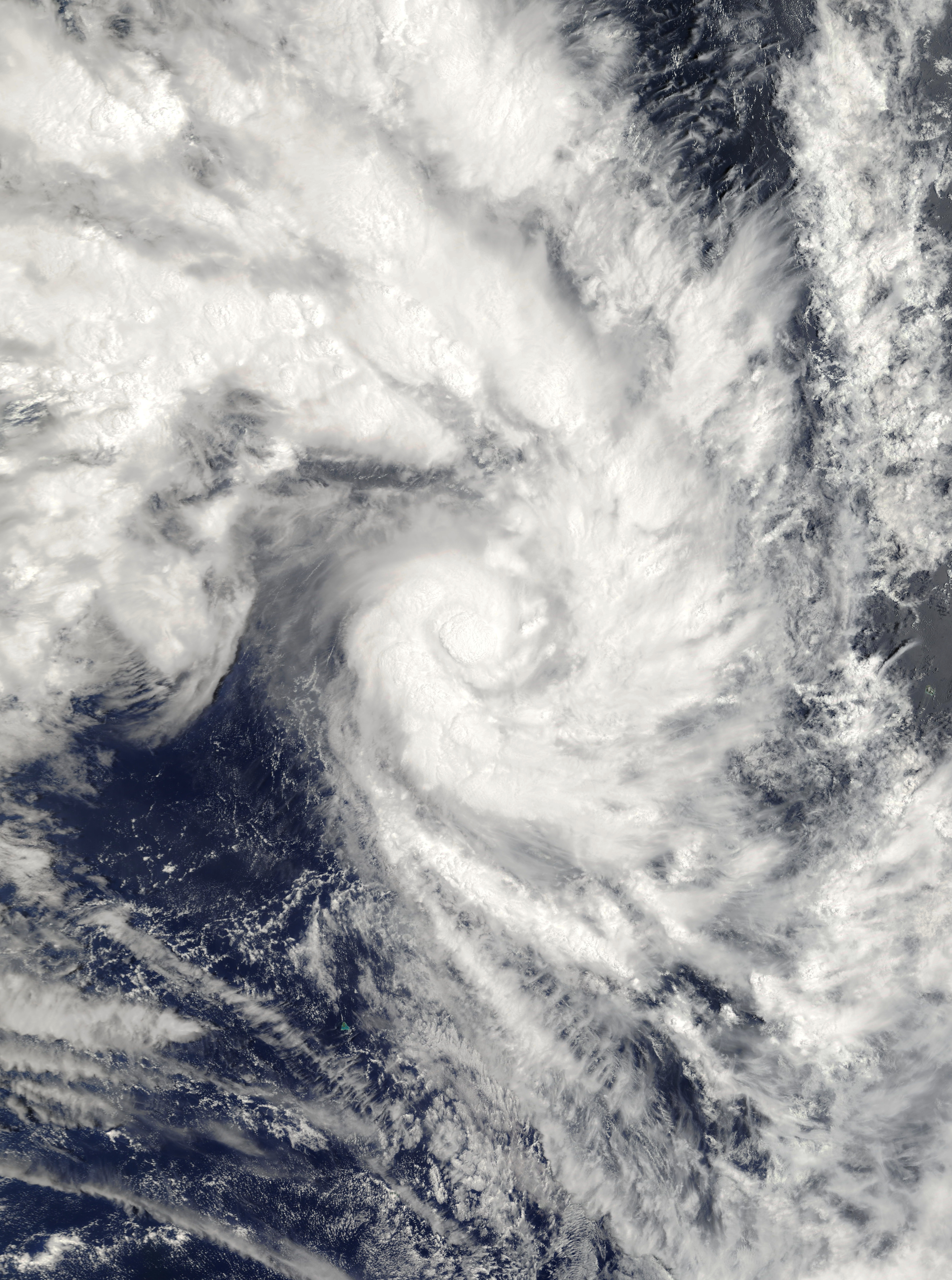
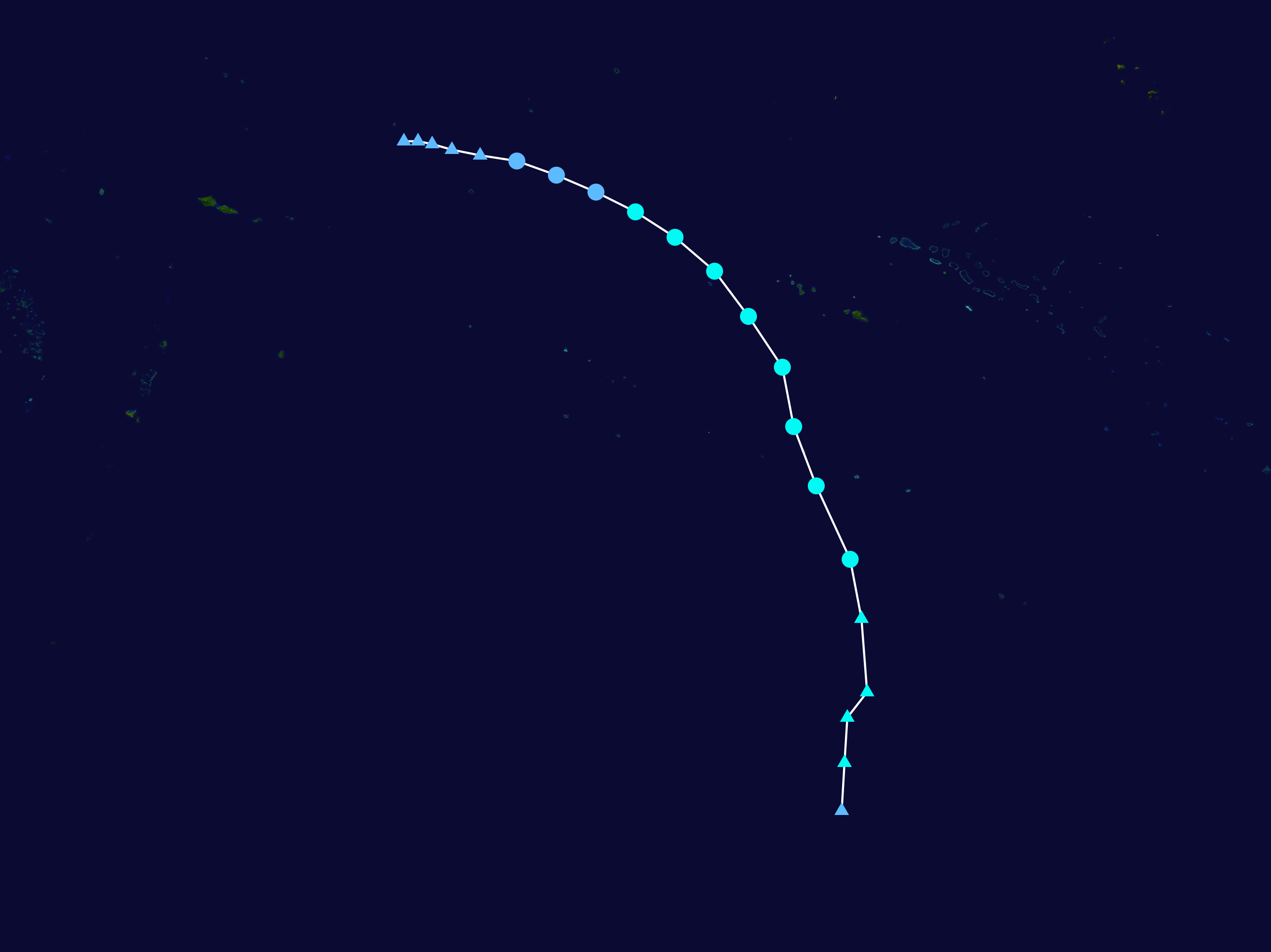
- Duration: January 18 – January 25
- Peak intensity: 110 km/h (70 mph) (10-min); 975 hPa (mbar)

On January 16 a RSMC Nadi marine bulletin identified a tropical disturbance east of the International Date Line. The low level circulation center was unidentifiable but was estimated to be at the southwestern edge of the major convection. On January 18, RSMC Nadi identified the disturbance as a tropical depression while the system was still poorly organized. On January 20, the Joint Typhoon Warning Center noted the system and treated it as a tropical disturbance. On January 22, the JTWC issued a Tropical Cyclone Formation Alert on the system. The system was assigned the name Zita by RSMC Nadi and commented in their tropical disturbance summary that the cyclone had undergone explosive development. It then quickly began extratropical transition as it moved south-southeast, with the JTWC declaring it extratropical on January 24. It entered the warning area of TCWC Wellington later that day as it passed south of 25°S, and completed extratropical transition early on January 25.

=== Tropical Cyclone Arthur ===
- Category 2 tropical cyclone (Australian scale)
- Category 1 tropical cyclone (SSHWS)
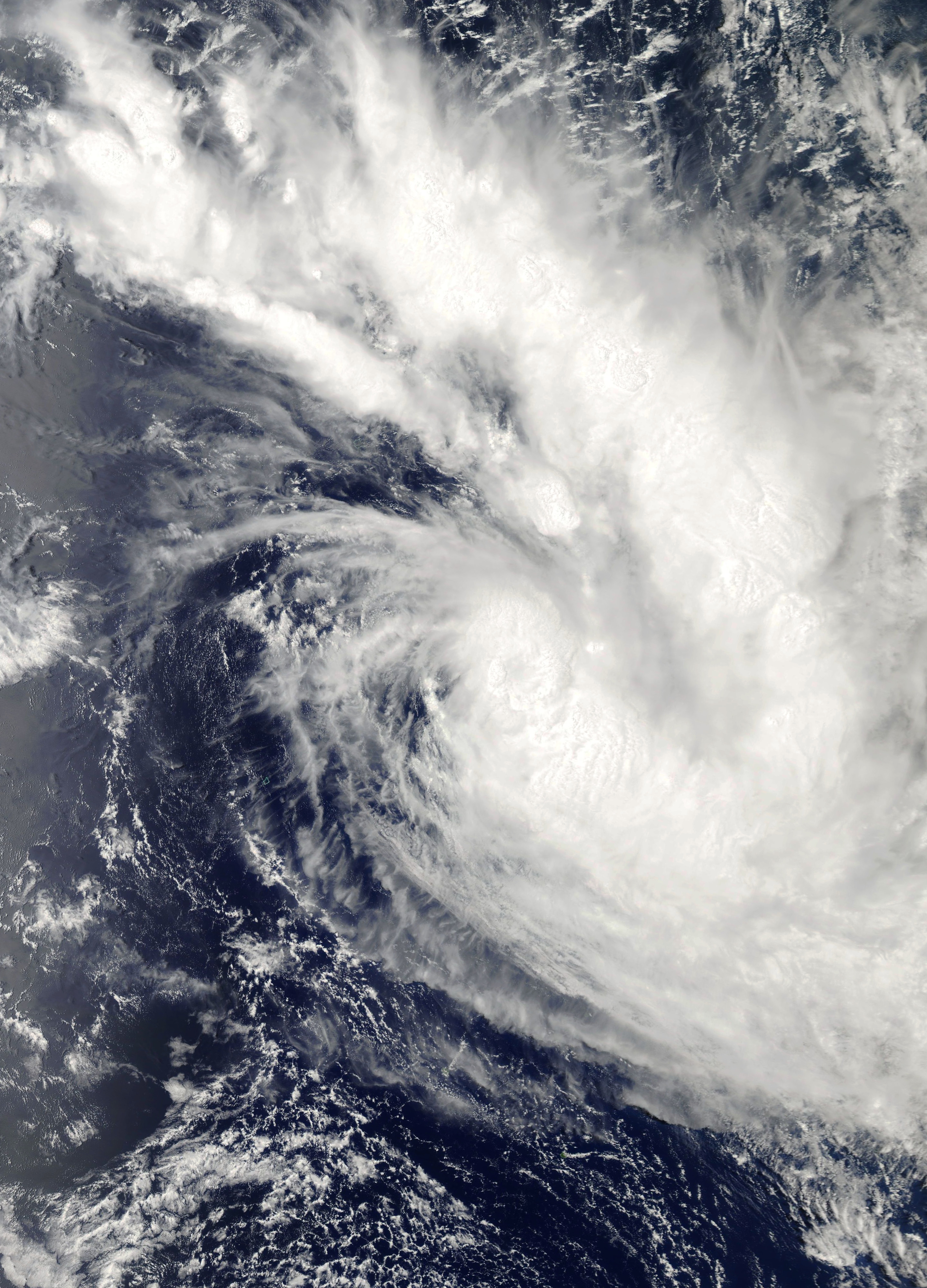
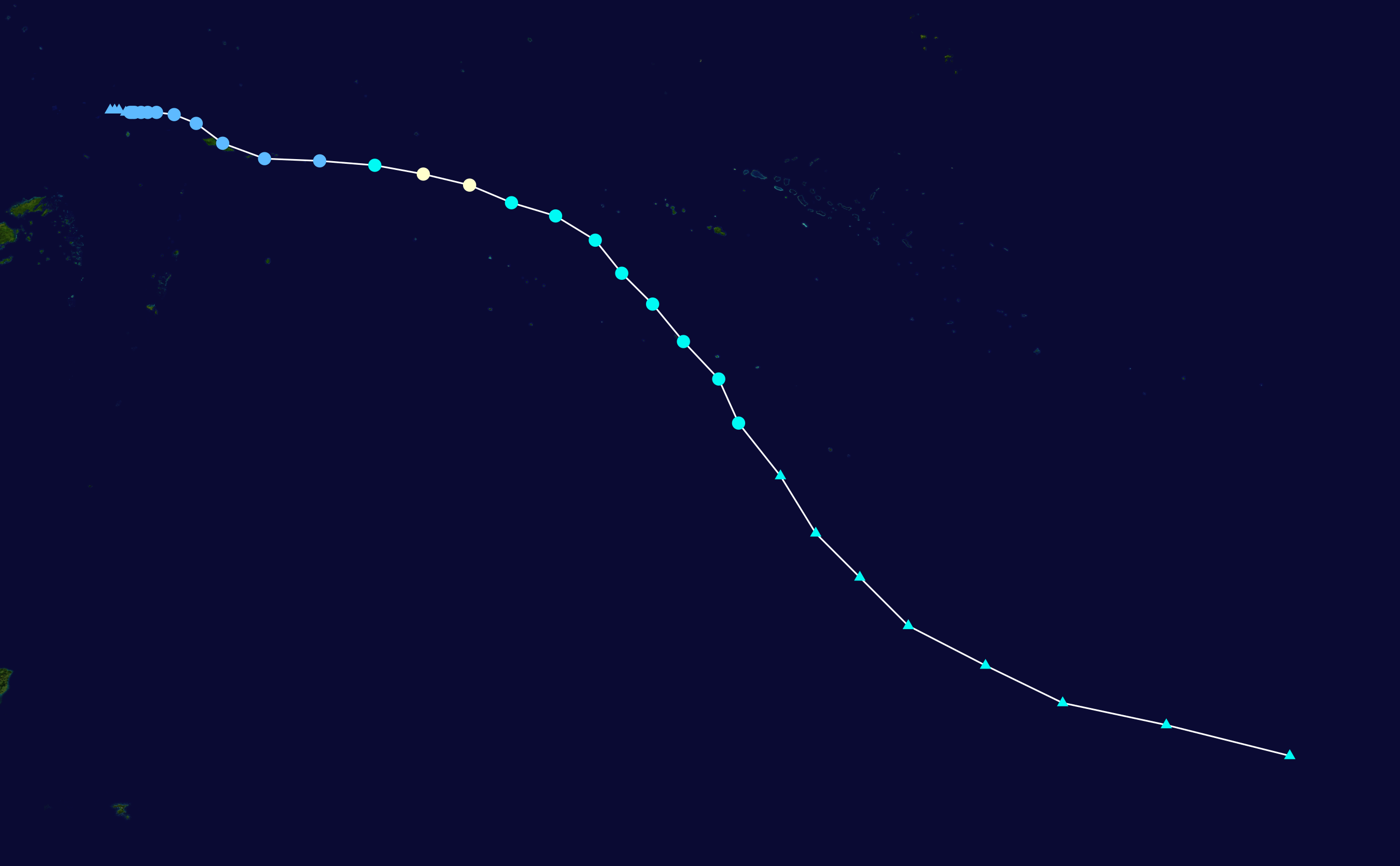
- Duration: January 21 – January 27
- Peak intensity: 110 km/h (70 mph) (10-min); 975 hPa (mbar)

Forming as tropical depression on January 25, Arthur rapidly intensified into a strong Category 2 cyclone on the Australian intensity scale according to the Regional Specialized Meteorological Centre in Nadi, Fiji. The Joint Typhoon Warning Center assessed the storm to have peaked as a minimal Category 1 cyclone. Shortly after peaking in intensity, the cyclone began to deteriorate due to unfavorable conditions. Quickly moving towards the east-southeast, the Arthur began to undergo an extratropical transition. After turning towards the southeast, the center of circulation was almost fully exposed due to strong wind shear. However, Arthur briefly re-strengthened late on January 26 before becoming extratropical the next day. Tropical Cyclone Arthur affected several small islands during its existence. French Polynesia observed the most noteworthy effects from the storm, where several landslides damaged a few homes.

=== Tropical Depression 09F ===
- Tropical depression (Australian scale)
- Tropical storm (SSHWS)
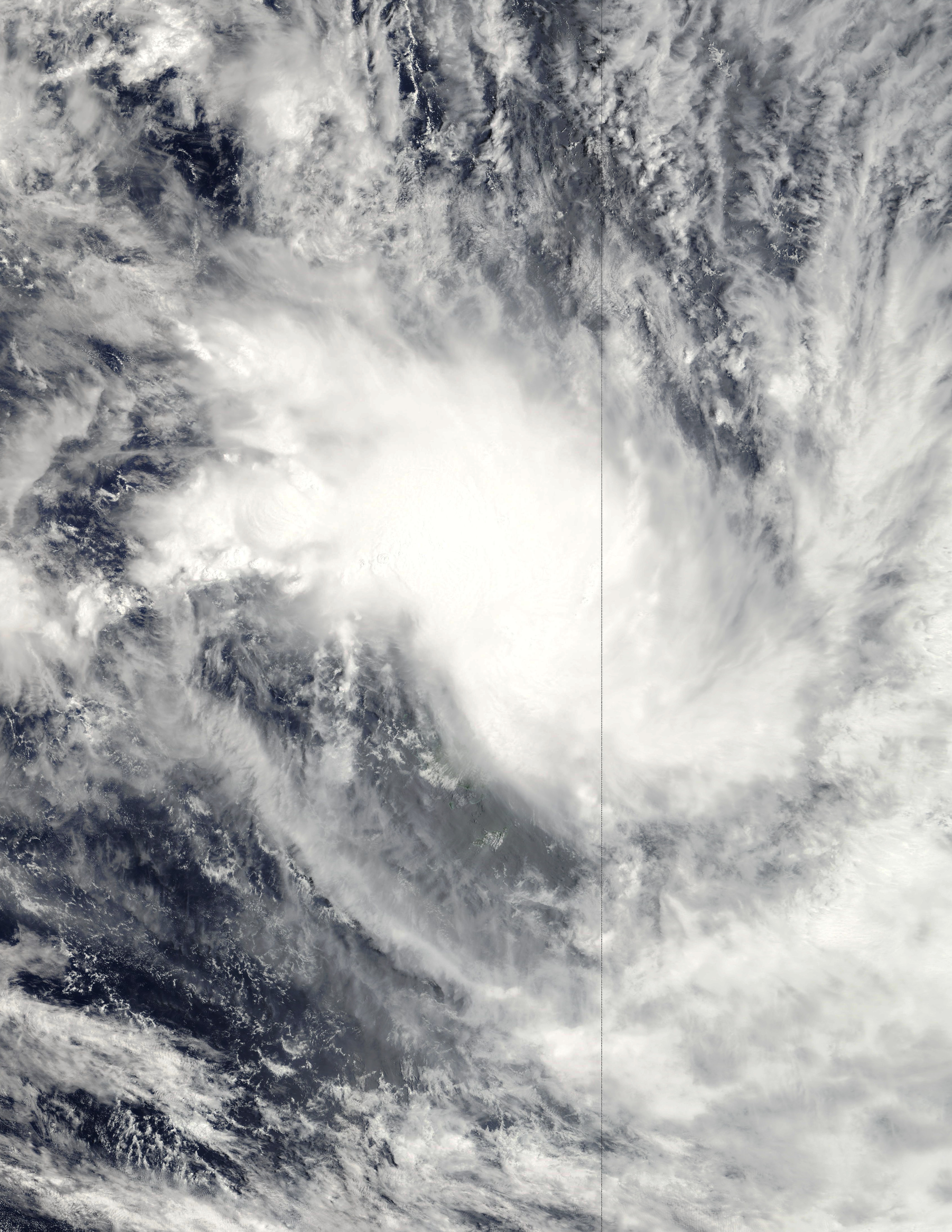
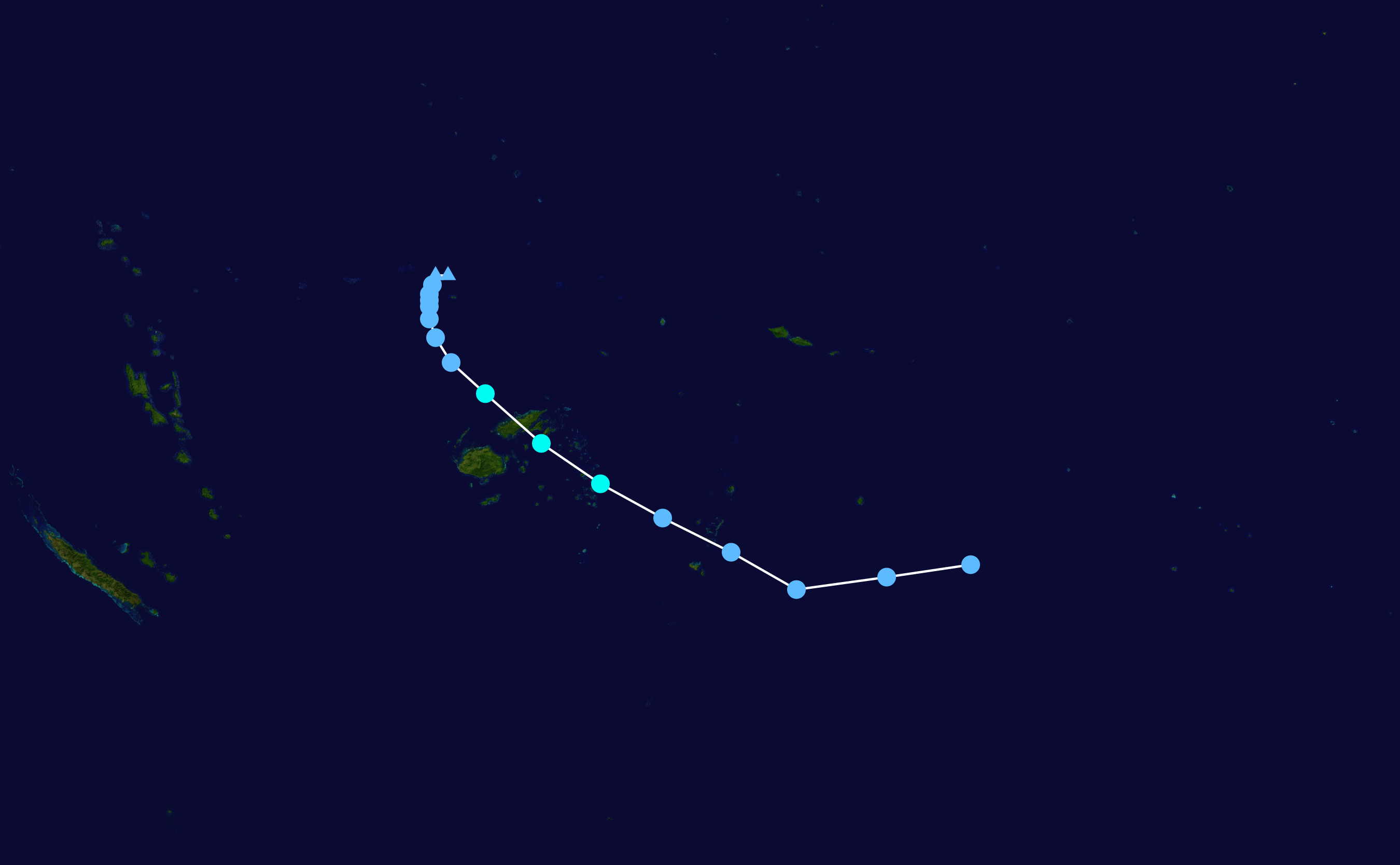
- Duration: February 1 – February 5
- Peak intensity: 55 km/h (35 mph) (10-min); 997 hPa (mbar)

RSMC Nadi noted a tropical disturbance in the general area of 10°S east of the International Date Line on January 30. On February 2, RSMC Nadi upgraded it to a tropical depression, and the next day, the Joint Typhoon Warning Center issued a Tropical Cyclone Formation Alert. On February 4, the JTWC upgraded the disturbance to a tropical cyclone, giving it the designation 11P. However, it quickly became extratropical, and the final warning was issued just 24 hours later. RSMC Nadi also stopped tracking the low on February 5.

=== Tropical Depression 12F ===
- Tropical depression (Australian scale)
- Duration: March 21 – March 25
- Peak intensity: 55 km/h (35 mph) (10-min); 998 hPa (mbar)

An area of disturbed weather formed northwest of Fiji on March 19 and moved southeast over the next three days with little change in organisation. On March 21, the system began to increase in organization, and RSMC Nadi designated the system Tropical Depression 12F late that day, noting that the potential for development into a tropical cyclone was low to moderate due to increasing wind shear to the south. The Joint Typhoon Warning Center issued a Tropical Cyclone Formation Alert on the now-quasi-stationary system the next day. RSMC Nadi upgraded the potential for development to high and began issuing advisories later in the day, but the depression soon became disorganised due to increasing shear. The RSMC issued its last advisory early on March 25.

=== Tropical Cyclone Becky ===
- Category 2 tropical cyclone (Australian scale)
- Category 1 tropical cyclone (SSHWS)
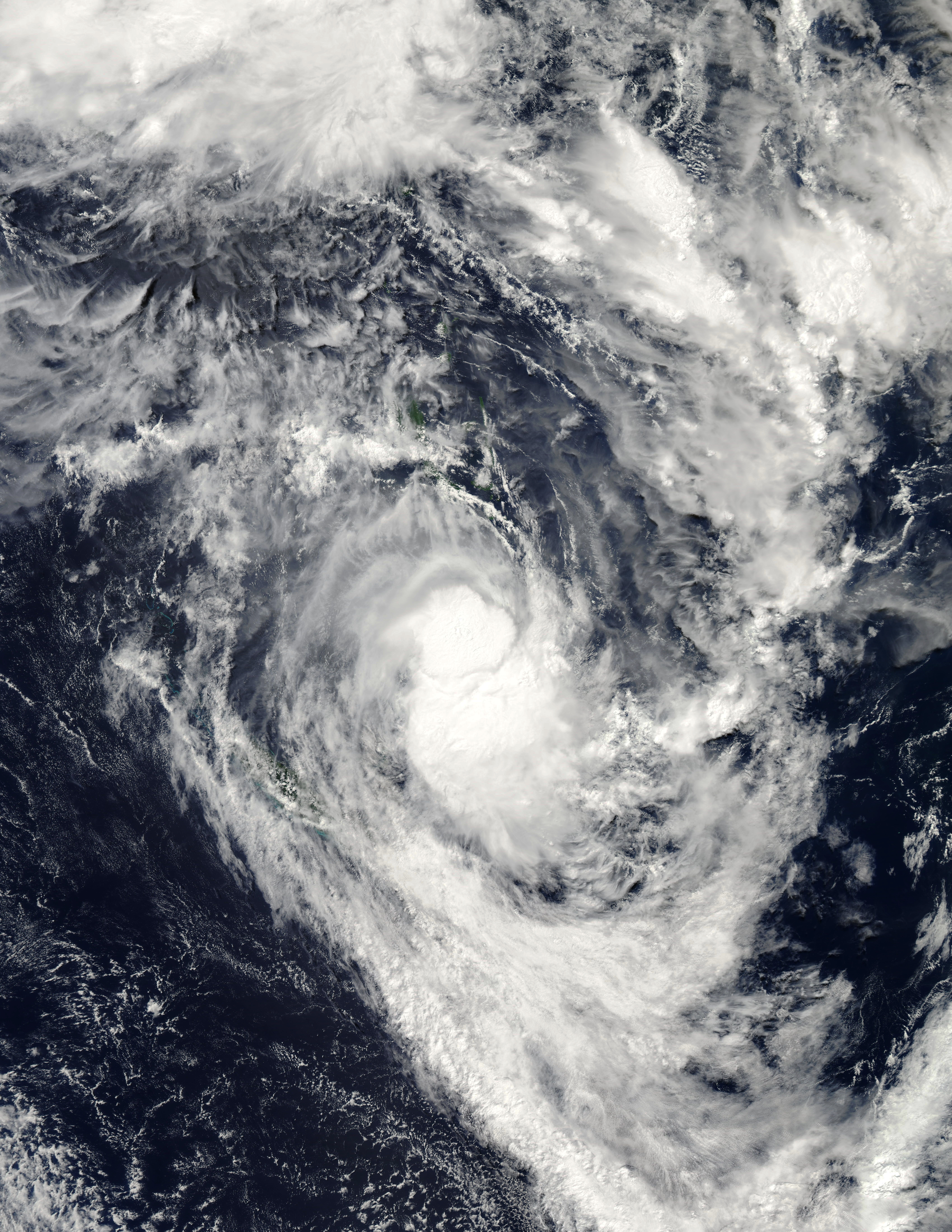
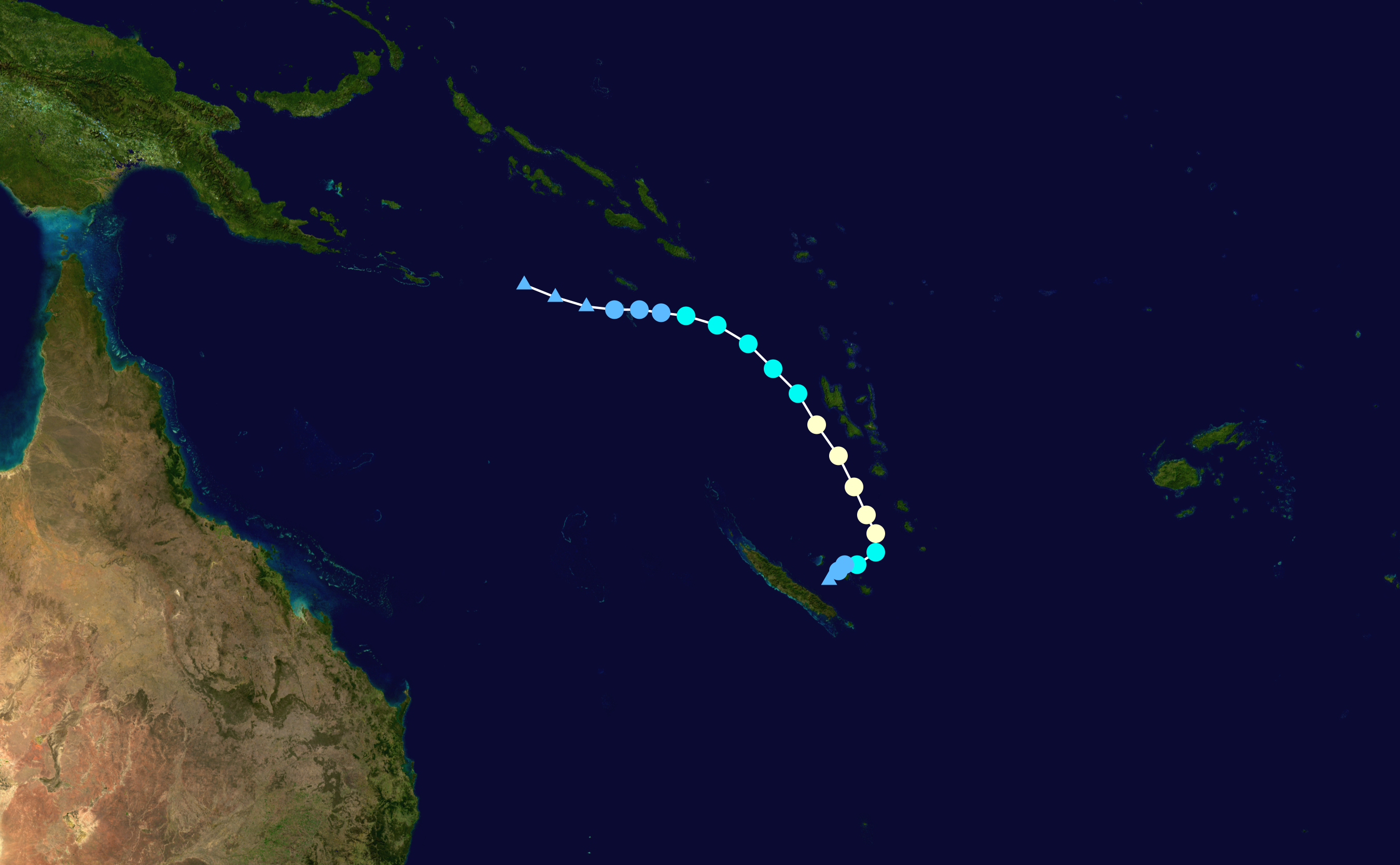
- Duration: March 25 – March 29
- Peak intensity: 110 km/h (70 mph) (10-min); 975 hPa (mbar)

An area of disturbed weather formed northwest of Vanuatu on March 24. The Tropical Cyclone Warning Centre in Brisbane began monitoring it as a tropical low early on March 25, before it moved eastward into the area of responsibility of RSMC Nadi later that day. RSMC Nadi designated the system Tropical Depression 13F and noted that it had a moderate potential for development into a tropical cyclone. Tropical disturbance advisories were initiated on March 26 as the system improved in organisation. The Joint Typhoon Warning Center designated it Tropical Cyclone 21P later that day. RSMC Nadi followed suit and upgraded the system to a tropical cyclone and named it Becky.

Becky initially strengthened quickly while moving south-southeastward, nearly reaching hurricane-equivalent intensity on March 27. RSMC Nadi initially issued a storm warning for Vanuatu, but the environment began to deteriorate, inhibiting any further strengthening. The cyclone began weakening late that day as it passed to the west of Vanuatu, and RSMC Nadi issued its final tropical disturbance advisory on Becky early on March 29.

=== Tropical Cyclone Cliff ===
- Category 2 tropical cyclone (Australian scale)
- Tropical storm (SSHWS)
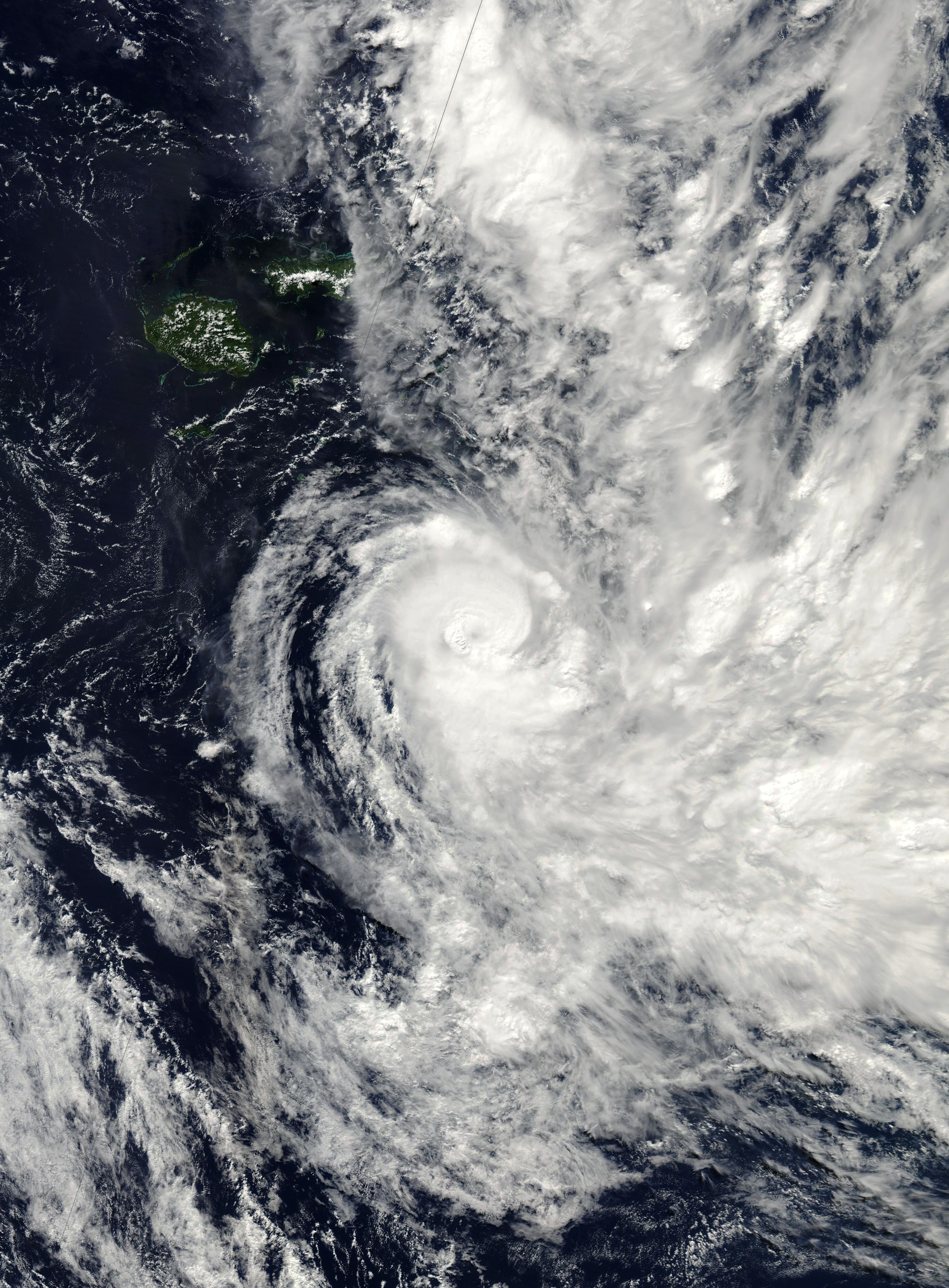
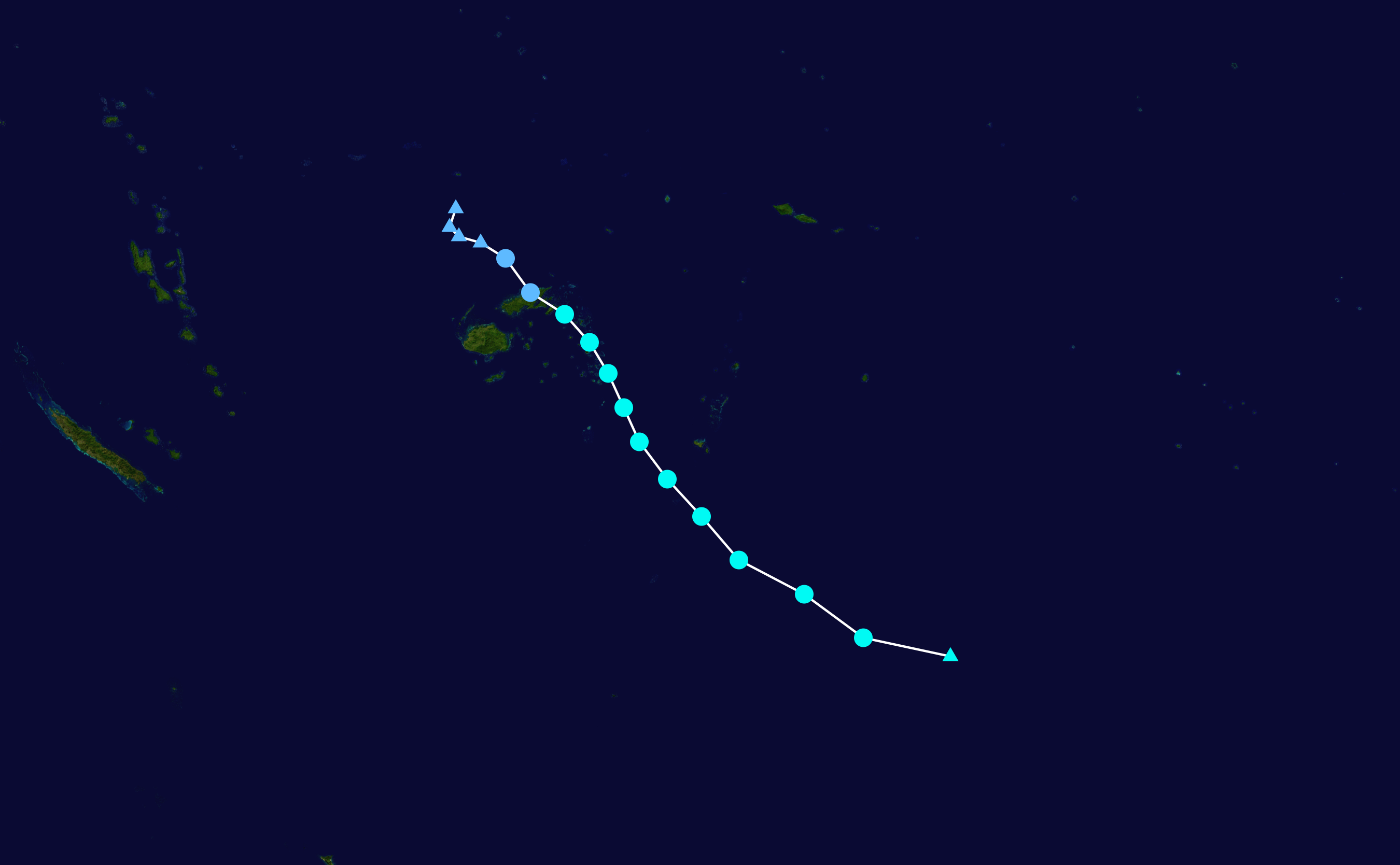
- Duration: April 1 – April 6
- Peak intensity: 100 km/h (65 mph) (10-min); 980 hPa (mbar)

Tropical Depression 14F, located around 15°S just west of the date line, was first warned on by RSMC Nadi on April 1 as a sheared system located in a highly sheared environment. Despite this, the system managed to organise and intensify as it moved southeast, and was named Tropical Cyclone Cliff on April 4 near the International Date Line. The Joint Typhoon Warning Center designated it a tropical cyclone, the 23rd in the Southern Hemisphere for the season, later that day, as deep convective banding began to develop. Continuing to move generally southeast, Cliff peaked in intensity on April 5 before starting to weaken as it crossed into the area of responsibility of TCWC Wellington. Late that night, Cliff started to show signs of extratropical transition, causing Dvorak satellite intensity estimates to fall. The JTWC issued its final advisory the next day, followed later that day by TCWC Wellington as it completed transition.

== Season effects ==
| Name | Dates | Peak intensity | | | Areas affected | Damage (USD) | Deaths | Ref(s). |
| Name | Dates | Category | Wind speed | Pressure | Areas affected | Damage (USD) | Deaths | Ref(s). |
|---|---|---|---|---|---|---|---|---|
| Xavier | October 21–28 | Category 4 severe tropical cyclone | 175 km/h (110 mph) | 930 hPa (27.46 inHg) | Solomon Islands, Vanuatu | Minimal | None | |
| 02F | October 24 — 29 | Tropical Depression | Not specified | 1,004 hPa (29.65 inHg) | None | None | None | |
| 03F | November 24 — 3 | Tropical Depression | Not specified | 1,004 hPa (29.65 inHg) | None | None | None | |
| Yani | November 16–26 | Category 3 severe tropical cyclone | 140 km/h (85 mph) | 960 hPa (28.35 inHg) | Solomon Islands | | | |
| 05F | November 29 – December 4 | Tropical depression | 55 km/h (35 mph) | 997 hPa (29.44 inHg) | | | | |
| 06F | January 9–17 | Tropical depression | 55 km/h (35 mph) | 1,000 hPa (29.53 inHg) | | | | |
| Zita | January 18–25 | Category 2 tropical cyclone | 100 km/h (65 mph) | 975 hPa (28.79 inHg) | French Polynesia | | | |
| Arthur | January 21–27 | Category 2 tropical cyclone | 100 km/h (65 mph) | 975 hPa (28.79 inHg) | Samoan Islands, French Polynesia | | | |
| 09F | February 1–5 | Tropical depression | Not specified | 997 hPa (29.44 inHg) | Fiji | | | |
| 10F | Not specified | Tropical disturbance | Not specified | Not specified | | | | |
| 11F | Not specified | Tropical disturbance | Not specified | Not specified | | | | |
| 12F | March 21–25 | Tropical depression | 55 km/h (35 mph) | 998 hPa (29.47 inHg) | | | | |
| Becky | March 25–29 | Category 2 tropical cyclone | 110 km/h (70 mph) | 975 hPa (28.79 inHg) | Solomon Islands, Vanuatu; New Caledonia | | | |
| Cliff | April 1–6 | Category 2 tropical cyclone | 100 km/h (65 mph) | 980 hPa (28.94 inHg) | Fiji | | | |
| 15F | Not specified | Tropical depression | Not specified | Not specified | | | | |
Season aggregates
| 15 systems | October 21 – April 6 | | 175 km/h (110 mph) | 930 hPa (27.46 inHg) | | | | |

== See also ==
- Tropical cyclones in 2006 and 2007
- Atlantic hurricane seasons: 2006, 2007
- Pacific hurricane seasons: 2006, 2007
- Pacific typhoon seasons: 2006, 2007
- North Indian Ocean cyclone seasons: 2006, 2007
