= Movie theaters in Stockholm =

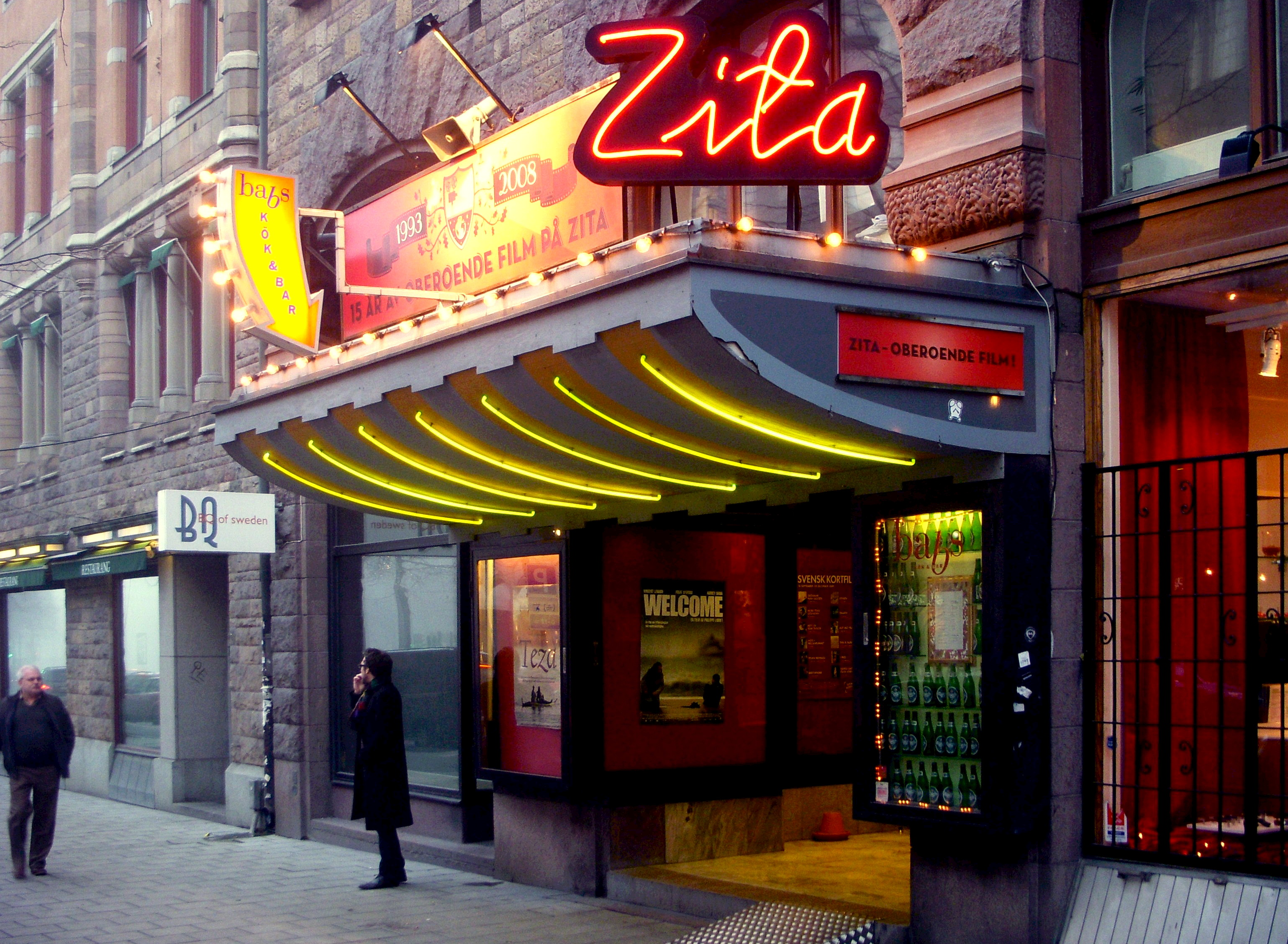
Zita, Stockholm's oldest movie theater, in service since 1913

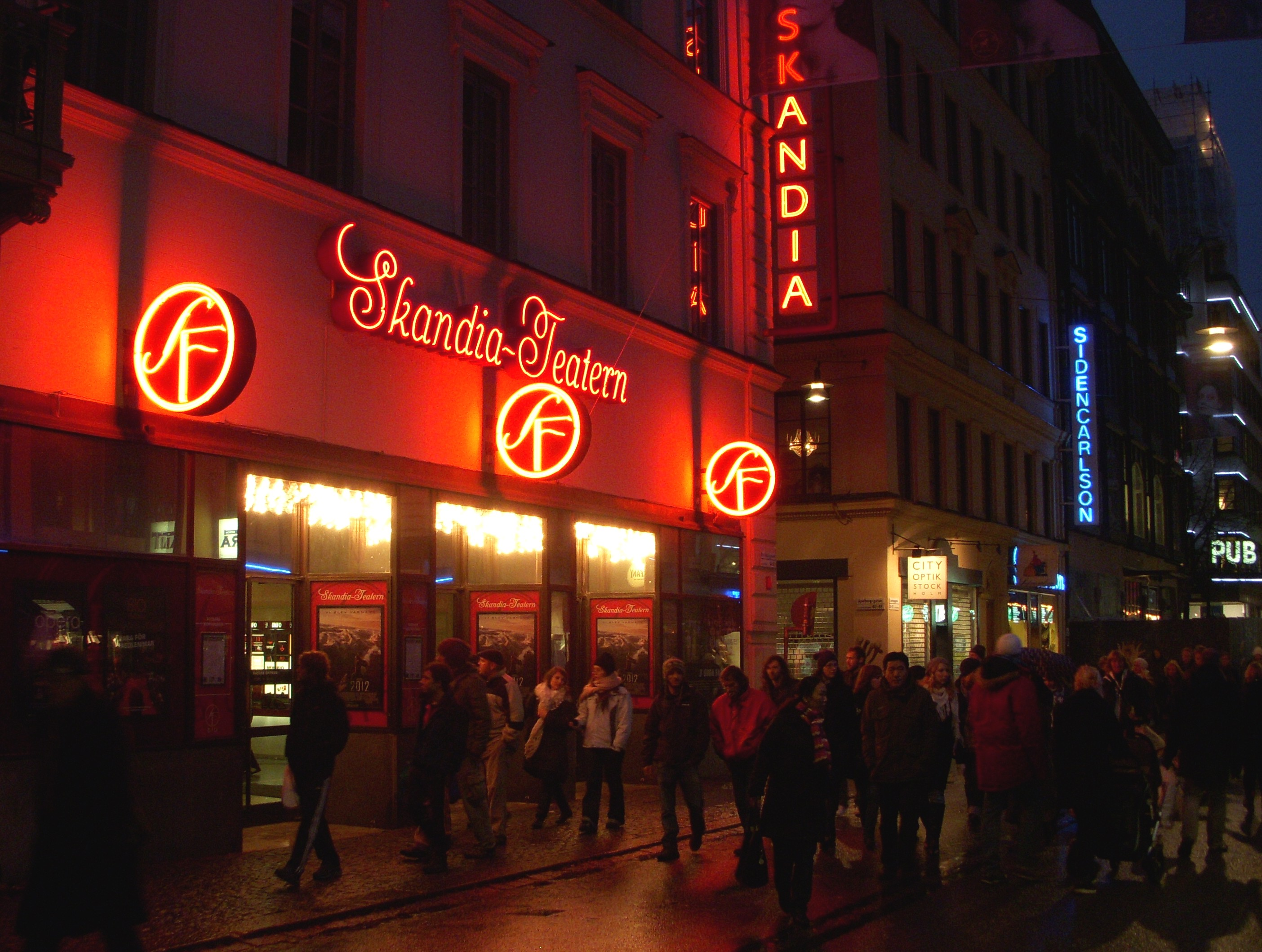
The Skandia Theater, Gunnar Asplund's masterpiece

The first attempts at building permanent movie theaters in Stockholm were made in the end of the 1890s as a result of the demonstration of the cinematograph at the General Art and Industrial Exposition of Stockholm in 1897. Prior to the demonstration, only travelling entertainers had demonstrated the concept of the movie theater.

In 1905, the city had ten movie theaters, and by the end of 1909 the number had risen to 25 permanent movie theaters. The highest number of movie theaters operating at the same time in Stockholm was 110. By 2009, the number of movie theaters had declined to a dozen or less. The highest-ever number of people visiting movie theaters in Stockholm was 16,8 million 1956.

The city's oldest movie theater, Zita, which opened under the name Vinter-Palatset (the Winter Palace) in 1913. The Skandia Theater, which is regarded to be Stockholm's most beautiful of its kind, opened in 1923 and was built according to architect Gunnar Asplund's plans. It was described by art experts at the time as a masterpiece, and is one of the few remaining movie theaters in the city that can only show one film at a time. The Skandia Theater was renovated to its original condition in 2001, and is protected under the Cultural Environment Protection Act.
