= Zeta (name) =

Zeta is a unisex given name and a surname of Greek origin. Notable people with the name are as follows:

== Given name ==
=== Male ===
- Zeta Bosio, stage name of Héctor Juan Pedro Bosio Bertolotti (born 1958), Argentine musical artist
- Oscar Zeta Acosta (1935–disappeared 1974), Mexican-American lawyer

=== Female ===
- Zeta Makripoulia (born 1978), Greek actress

== Surname ==
- Catherine Zeta-Jones (born 1969), Welsh actress
- Pilar Zeta (born 1986), Argentine multimedia artist

== Fictional characters ==
- Zeta, a character in Gunnerkrigg Court
- Zeta, a character in Slave of the Huns
- Zeta (ゼータ), a cat beast-kin girl and the sixth member of Shadow Garden in the light novel and anime series The Eminence in Shadow
- Zeta, the main antagonist in the animated film The Angry Birds Movie 2
- Zeta the Sorceress, a character in Shimmer and Shine
- Infiltration Unit Zeta, a character in the DC Animated Universe
