= 2005–06 Southern Hemisphere tropical cyclone season =

The 2005–06 Southern Hemisphere tropical cyclone season comprises three different basins. Their respective seasons are:

- 2005–06 South-West Indian Ocean cyclone season west of 90°E,
- 2005–06 Australian region cyclone season between 90°E and 160°E, and
- 2005–06 South Pacific cyclone season east of 160°E.
