= 2007–08 Southern Hemisphere tropical cyclone season =

The 2007–08 Southern Hemisphere tropical cyclone season is made up of three different basins and their respective seasons; the

- 2007–08 South-West Indian Ocean cyclone season west of 90°E,
- 2007–08 Australian region cyclone season between 90°E and 160°E, and
- 2007–08 South Pacific cyclone season east of 160°E.
