= 2005–06 Australian region cyclone season =

Tropical cyclone season

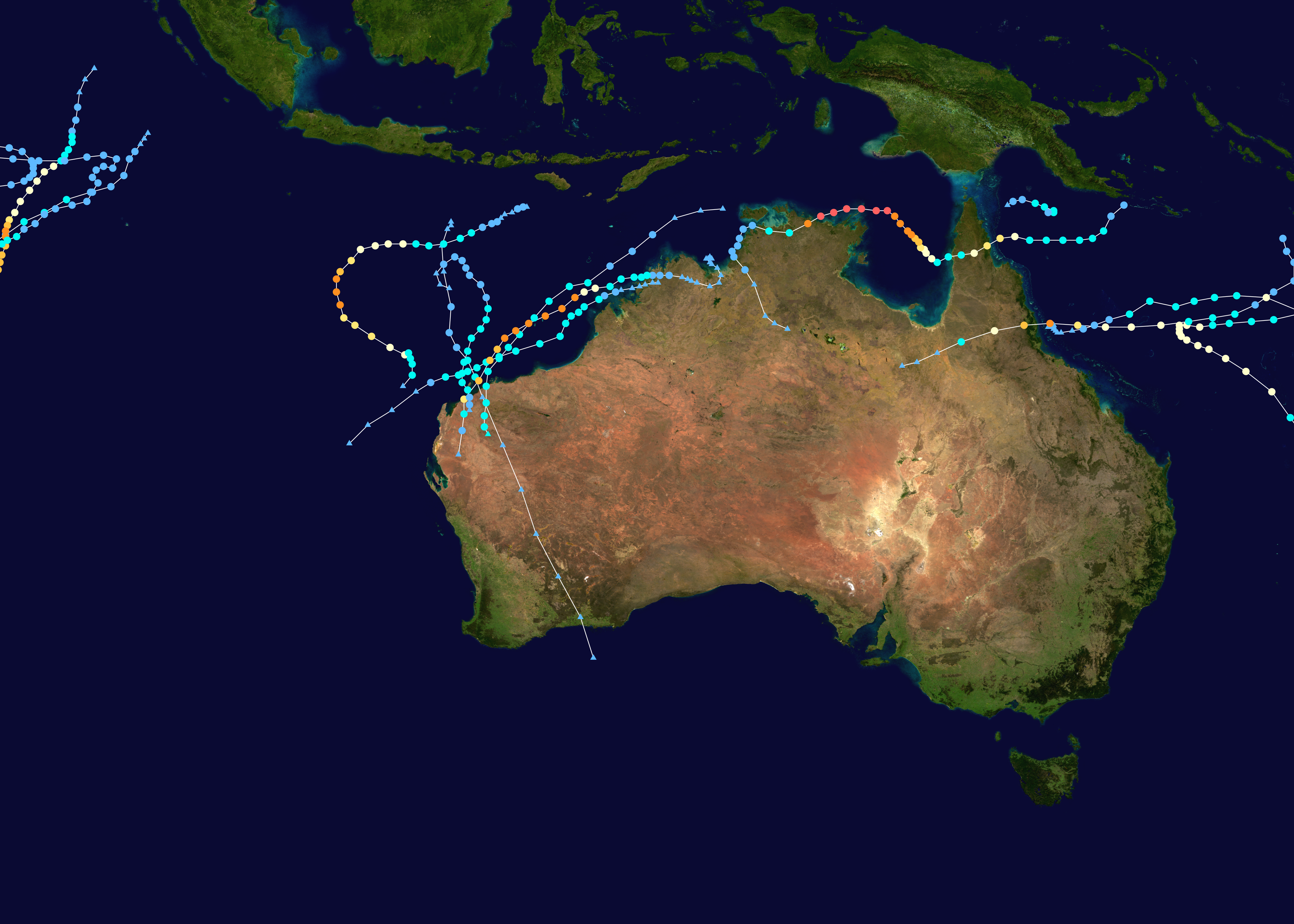
- Season summary map

Seasonal boundaries
- First system formed: 5 November 2005
- Last system dissipated: 26 April 2006

Strongest storm
- By maximum sustained winds: Monica
  - Maximum winds: 250 km/h (155 mph) (10-minute sustained)
  - Lowest pressure: 916 hPa (mbar)
- By central pressure: Glenda
  - Maximum winds: 205 km/h (125 mph) (10-minute sustained)
  - Lowest pressure: 910 hPa (mbar)

Seasonal statistics
- Tropical lows: 18
- Tropical cyclones: 12
- Severe tropical cyclones: 8
- Total fatalities: 1 indirect
- Total damage: $1.109 billion (2006 USD)

Related articles
- 2005–06 South-West Indian Ocean cyclone season; 2005–06 South Pacific cyclone season

The 2005–06 Australian region cyclone season was an above average tropical cyclone season. It began on 1 November 2005 and ended on 30 April 2006. The regional tropical cyclone operational plan also defines a tropical cyclone year separately from a tropical cyclone season, which runs from 1 July 2005 to 30 June 2006.

Tropical cyclones in this area are monitored by four Tropical Cyclone Warning Centres (TCWCs): the Australian Bureau of Meteorology in Perth, Darwin, and Brisbane; and TCWC Port Moresby in Papua New Guinea.

== Systems ==
=== Tropical Low 02S ===
- Tropical low (Australian scale)
- Tropical storm (SSHWS)
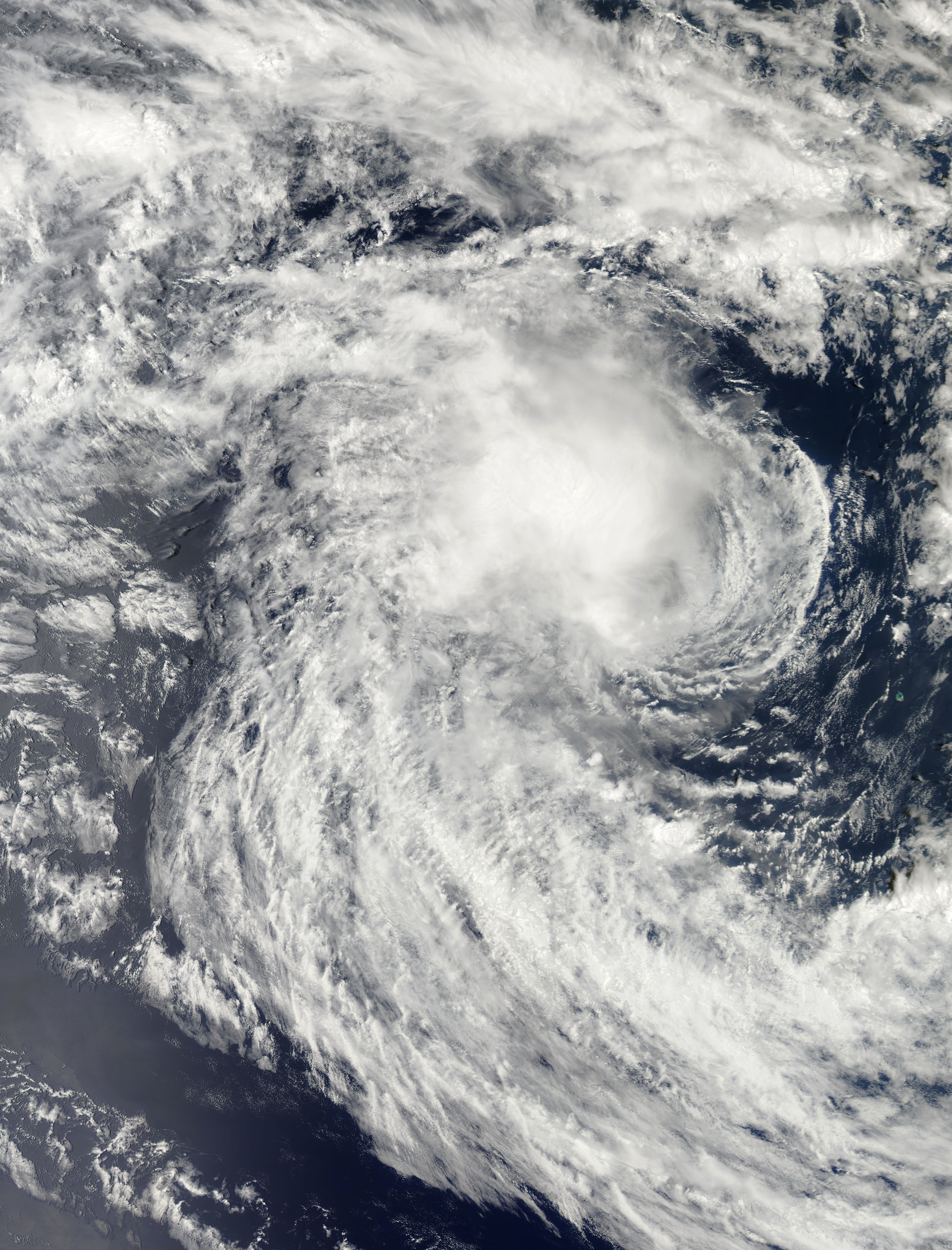
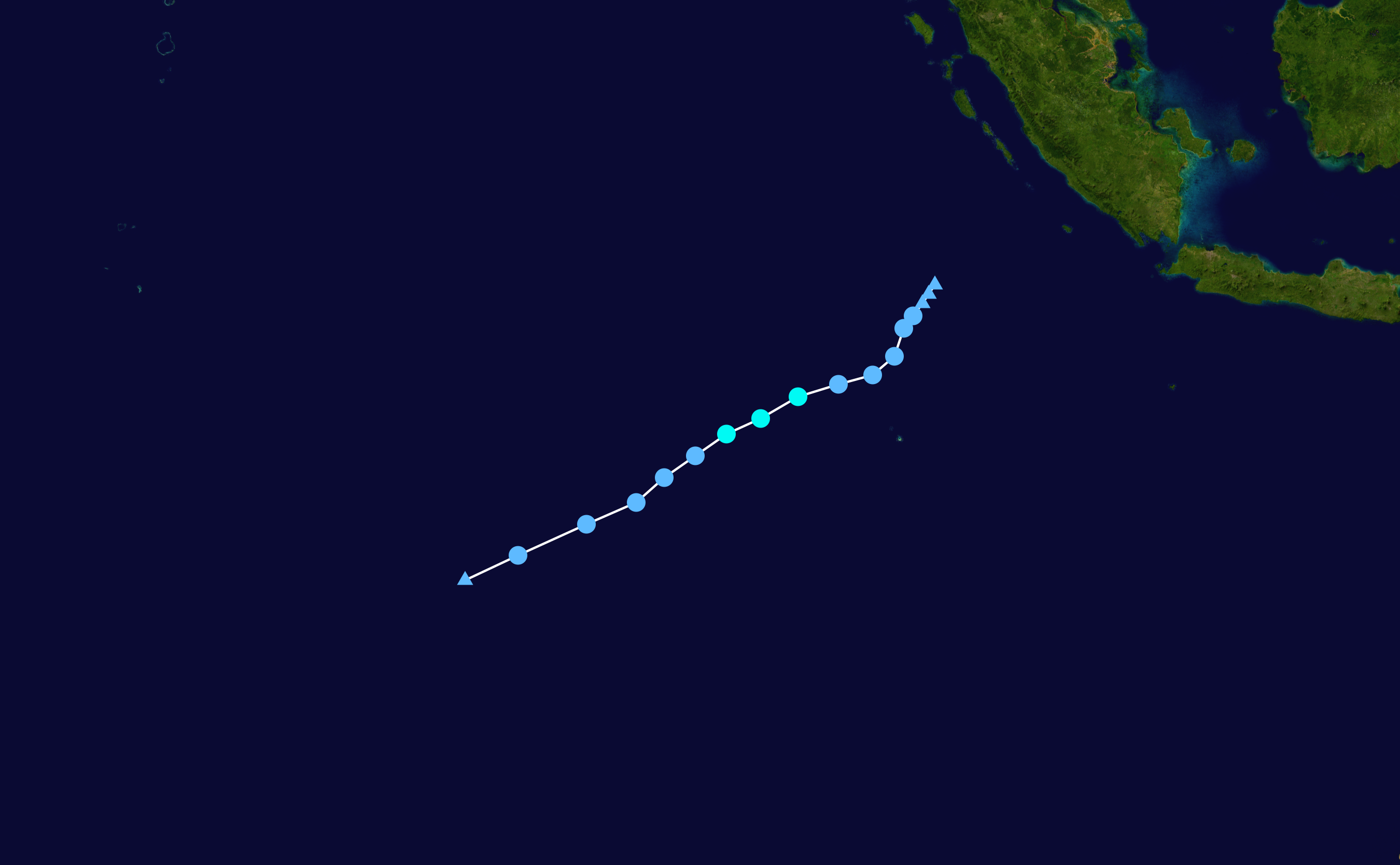
- Duration: 5 November – 6 November (exited basin)
- Peak intensity: 55 km/h (35 mph) (10-min); 995 hPa (mbar)

An area of convection persisted on 4 November about 560 km (350 mi) north of the Cocos Islands, associated with a tight low-level circulation. With good outflow and moderate but decreasing wind shear, conditions favored development. By early on 5 November, the system consisted of a partially exposed circulation with deep convection on its western side, tracking southwestward. At 0400 UTC that day, the Tropical Cyclone Warning Centre (TCWC) in Perth issued a gale warning in association with the disturbance. Later in the day, the Joint Typhoon Warning Center (JTWC) classified it as Tropical Cyclone 02S, and both the JTWC and TCWC Perth anticipated further strengthening.

Throughout its duration, TCWC Perth maintained the system as a 55 km/h (34 mph) tropical low. However, the JTWC assessed the storm as reaching peak winds of 85 km/h (53 mph), based on observations indicating the consolidation of convection over the center. The agency forecast the storm to strengthen further; however, by late on 6 November it had begun weakening. Around the same time, the storm crossed into the area of responsibility of Météo-France in Réunion (MFR); as such, it was re-designated as Tropical Depression 04. The depression continued southwestward as it slowly weakened. Early on 8 November, the JTWC issued its final warning, and six hours later, the MFR discontinued advisories while it was located about 1,485 km (923 mi) southeast of Diego Garcia.

=== Severe Tropical Cyclone Bertie–Alvin ===
- Category 4 severe tropical cyclone (Australian scale)
- Category 4 tropical cyclone (SSHWS)
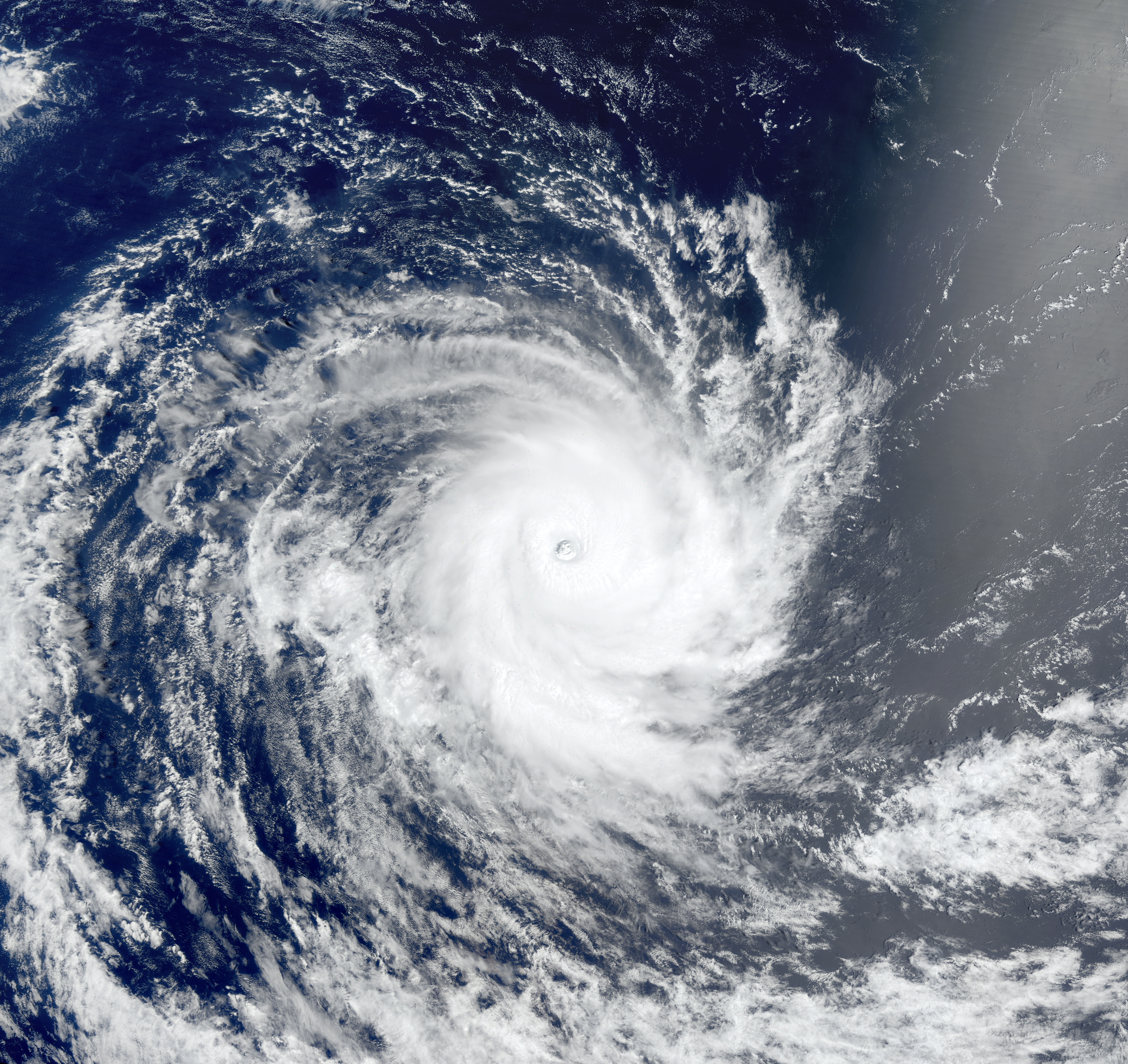
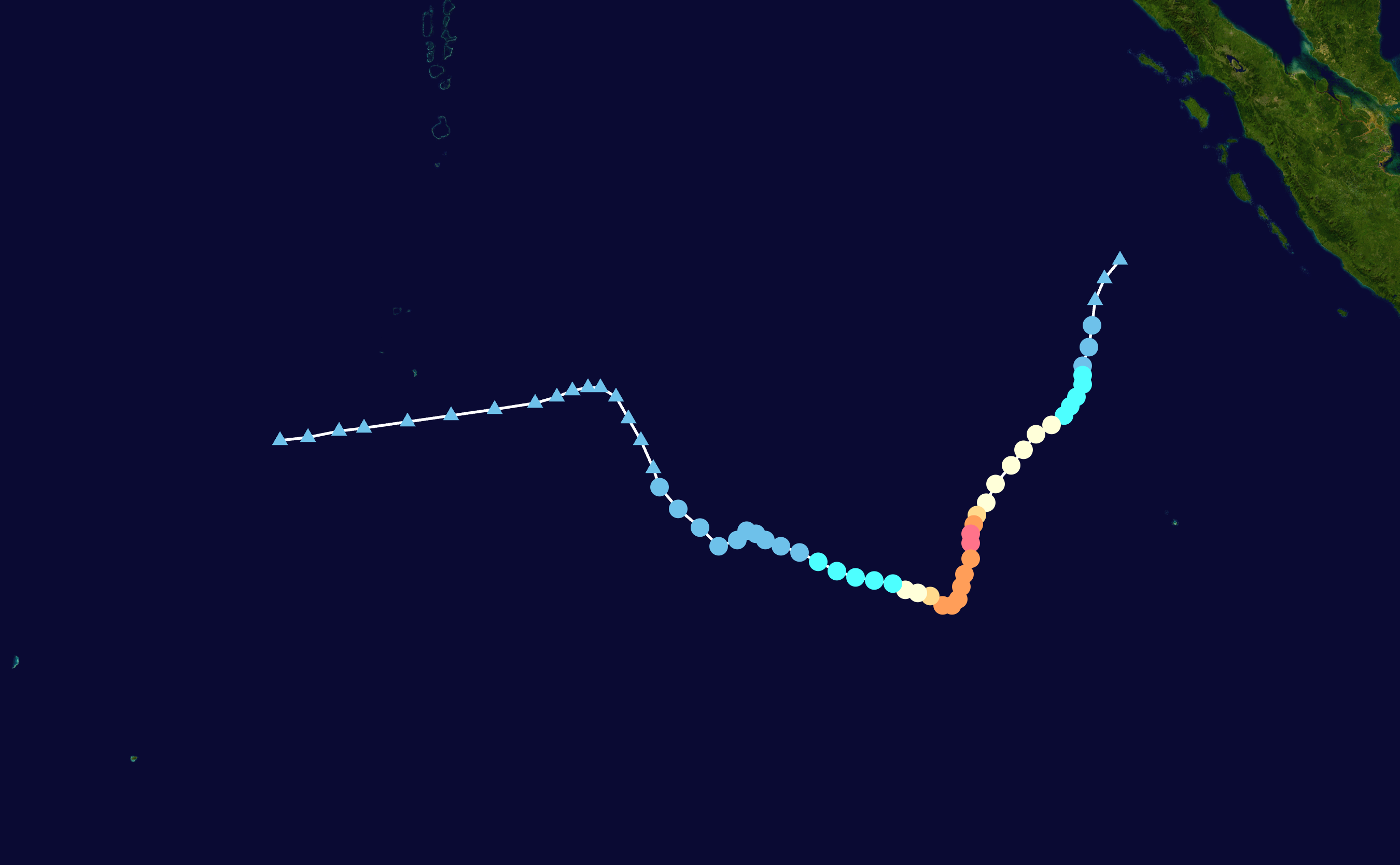
- Duration: 19 November – 24 November (exited basin)
- Peak intensity: 185 km/h (115 mph) (10-min); 928 hPa (mbar)

A weak tropical low persisted on 17 November at a low latitude about 740 km (460 mi) west-southwest of the Indonesia island of Sumatra. Early on 18 November, the TCWC Perth issued a gale warning on the system; at the time, the system consisted of cycling convection in association with several small circulations. The circulations organized into a well-defined center of circulation, and at 0000 UTC on 19 November it was classified as Tropical Cyclone Bertie about 835 km (519 mi) northwest of the Cocos Islands. The storm tracked southwestward around the western periphery of a mid-level ridge between Australia and Indonesia. Environmental conditions generally favored further strengthening, with good outflow though moderate wind shear, and late on 19 November the JTWC initiated advisories on Bertie.

Tropical Cyclone Bertie gradually strengthened and became a Severe Tropical Cyclone on 21 November. The next day, TCWC Perth issued its last advisory on the cyclone, as it was expected to cross 90ºE, which separates the TCWC Perth and the Météo-France (MFR) areas of responsibility. However, Bertie turned due southward, and the MFR issued advisories for 30 hours as the cyclone remained just east of 90ºE, during which the MFR estimated Bertie attained peak winds of 185 km/h (115 mph). Early on 23 November, the JTWC assessed the cyclone as reaching winds of 210 km/h (130 mph), which is the equivalent to a marginal Category 4 on the Saffir–Simpson hurricane scale. On 24 November, the cyclone crossed into the area of responsibility of the MFR, and it was renamed Intense Tropical Cyclone Alvin. Shortly thereafter the storm turned to the northwest and weakened as it encountered unfavourable conditions The JTWC issued its last advisory on 26 November after it weakened to a tropical depression, and two days later the MFR discontinued advisories. The remnants of the storm continued northwestward until turning west-southwestward and dissipating on 3 December.

=== Tropical Low 04S ===
- Tropical low (Australian scale)
- Tropical depression (SSHWS)
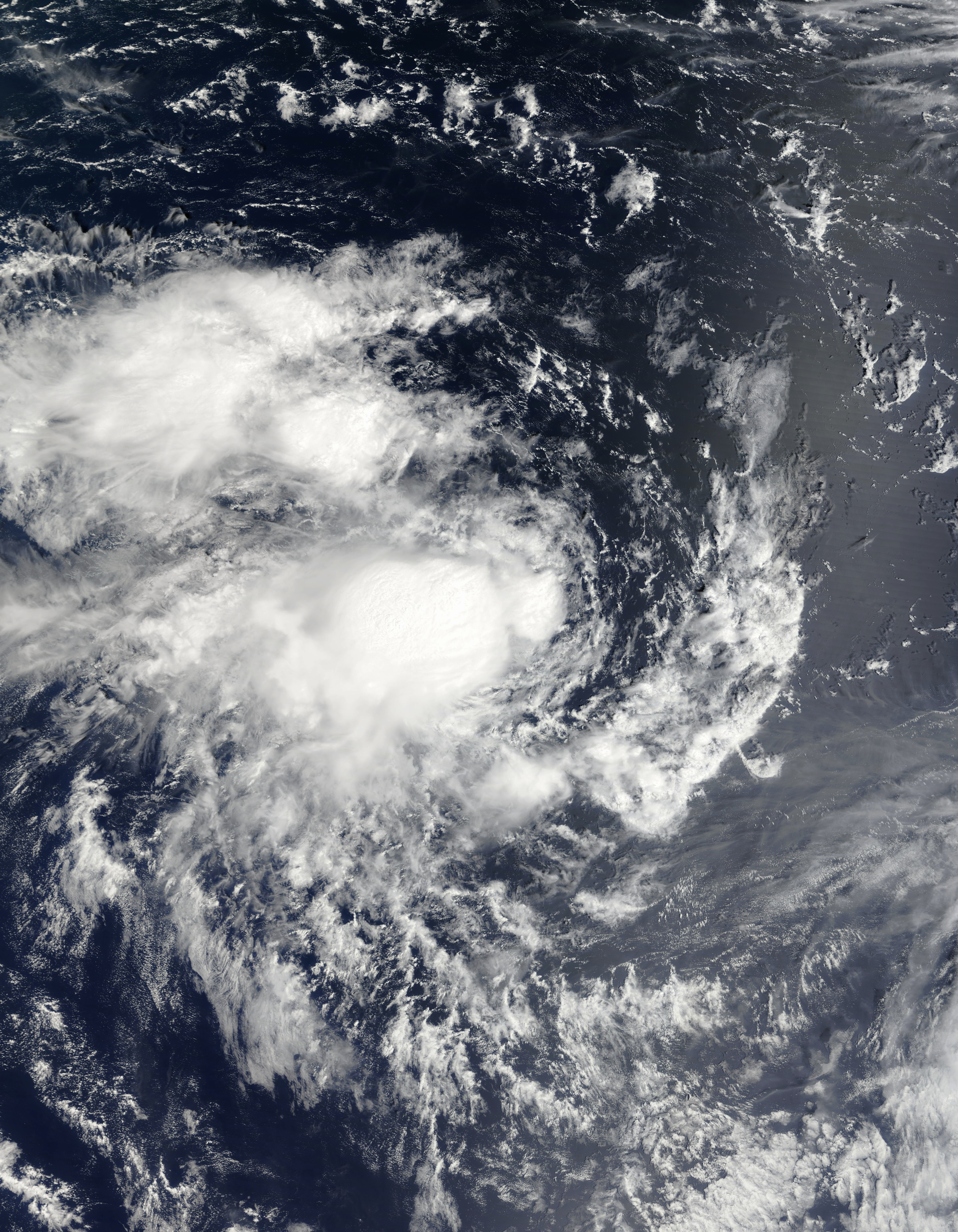
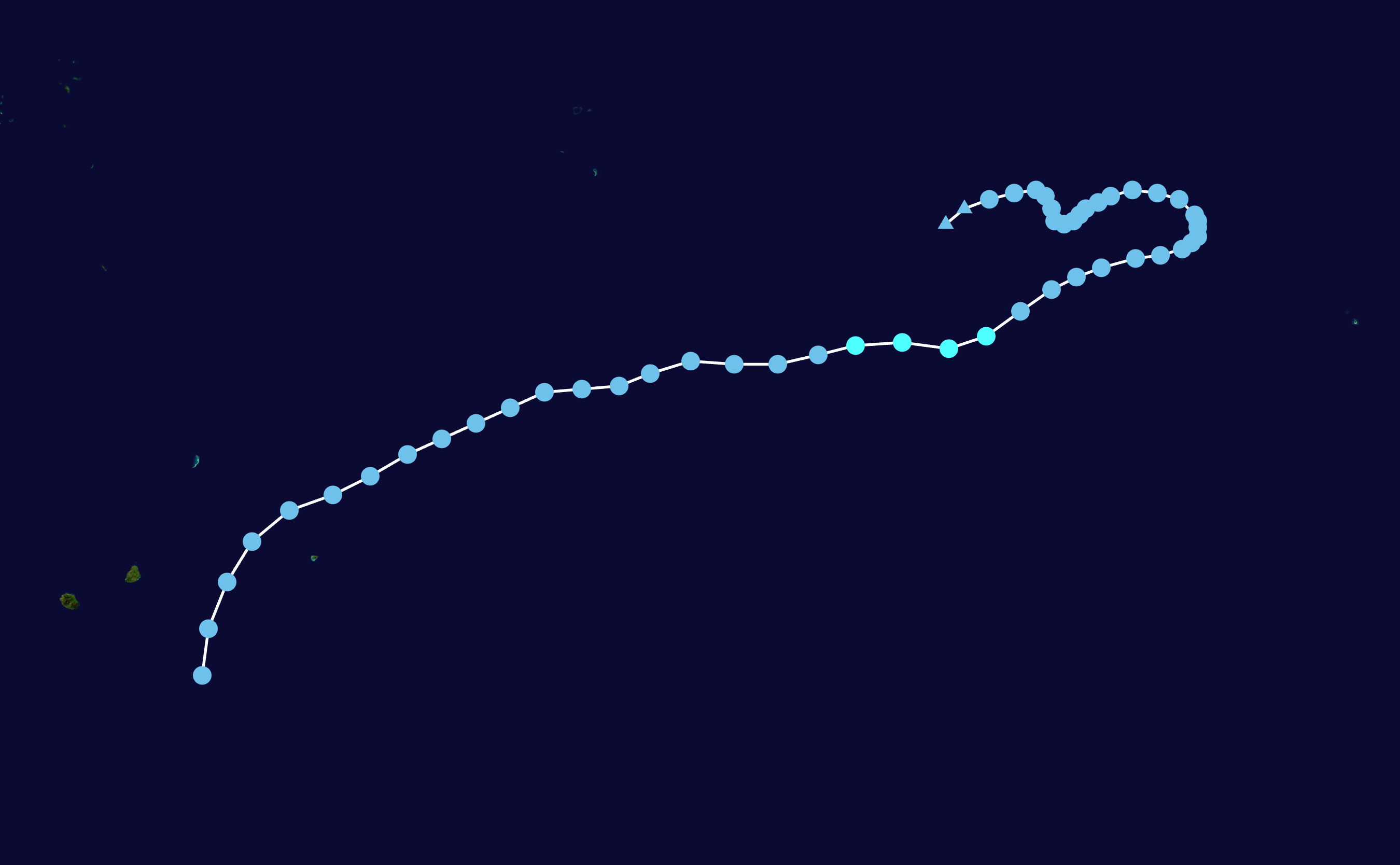
- Duration: 21 December – 23 December (exited basin)
- Peak intensity: 55 km/h (35 mph) (10-min); 998 hPa (mbar)

A tropical low persisted on 19 December just west of 90ºE, which is just outside the area of responsibility of TCWC Perth. The system initially consisted of pulsating convection in association with an elongated and partially exposed low-level circulation. TCWC Perth began issuing gale warnings on the system on 22 December as the low tracked southeastward. Moderate wind shear persisted over the system, preventing immediate development The low turned southwestward, and on 23 December it entered the area of responsibility of Météo-France in Réunion (MFR).

Upon entering the South-West Indian Ocean, the MFR classified the system as Tropical Depression 06. Convection increased and organized, and the JTWC initiated advisories on Tropical Cyclone 04S on 24 December. However, wind shear increased shortly thereafter, and the system weakened. On 25 December, the JTWC discontinued advisories, and a day later the MFR followed suit. The remnants tracked southwestward, and the MFR again issued advisories starting on 27 December. After passing near Rodrigues, the system weakened again due to persistent vertical wind shear, and on 29 December the MFR again issued the final warning on the system.

=== Severe Tropical Cyclone Clare ===
- Category 3 severe tropical cyclone (Australian scale)
- Tropical storm (SSHWS)
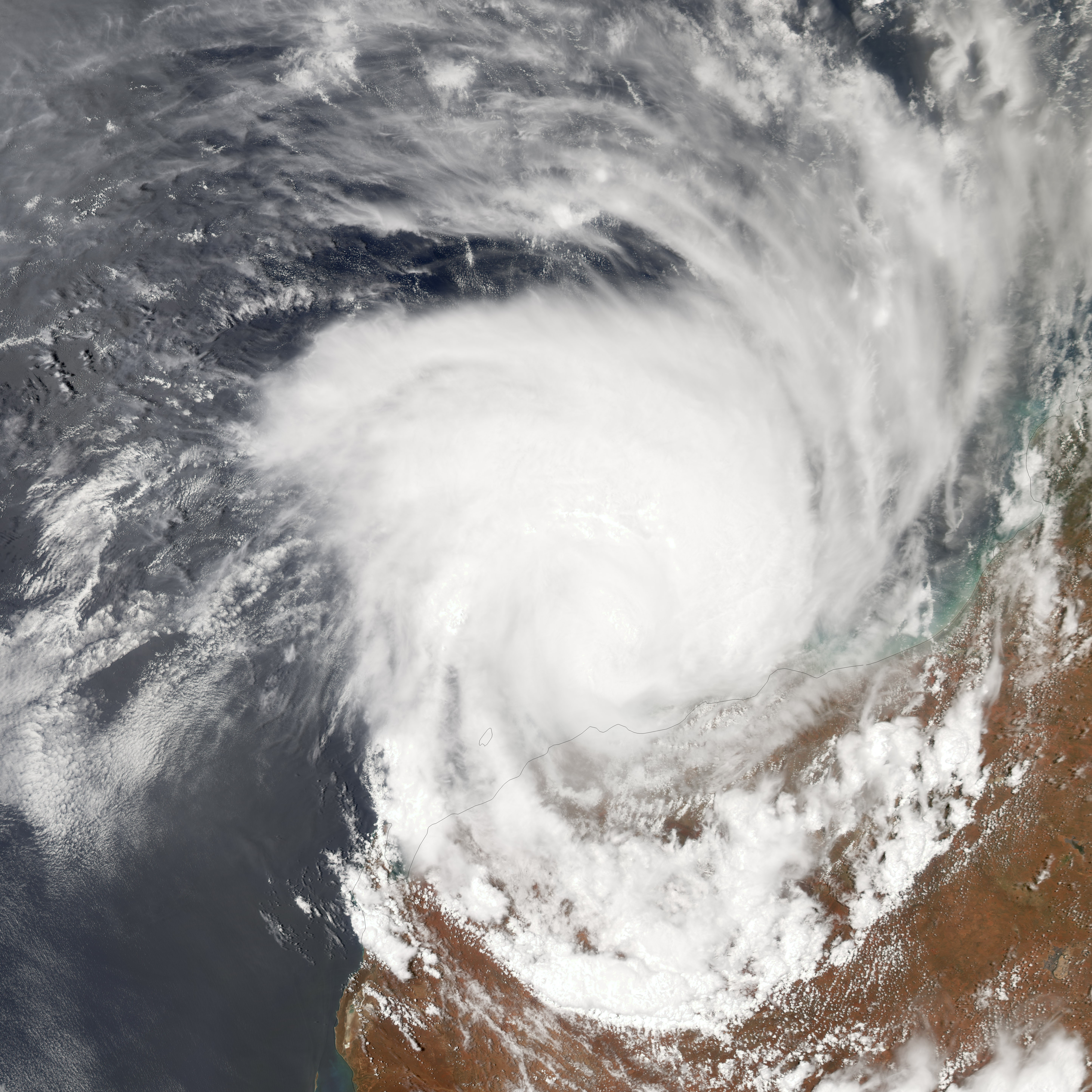
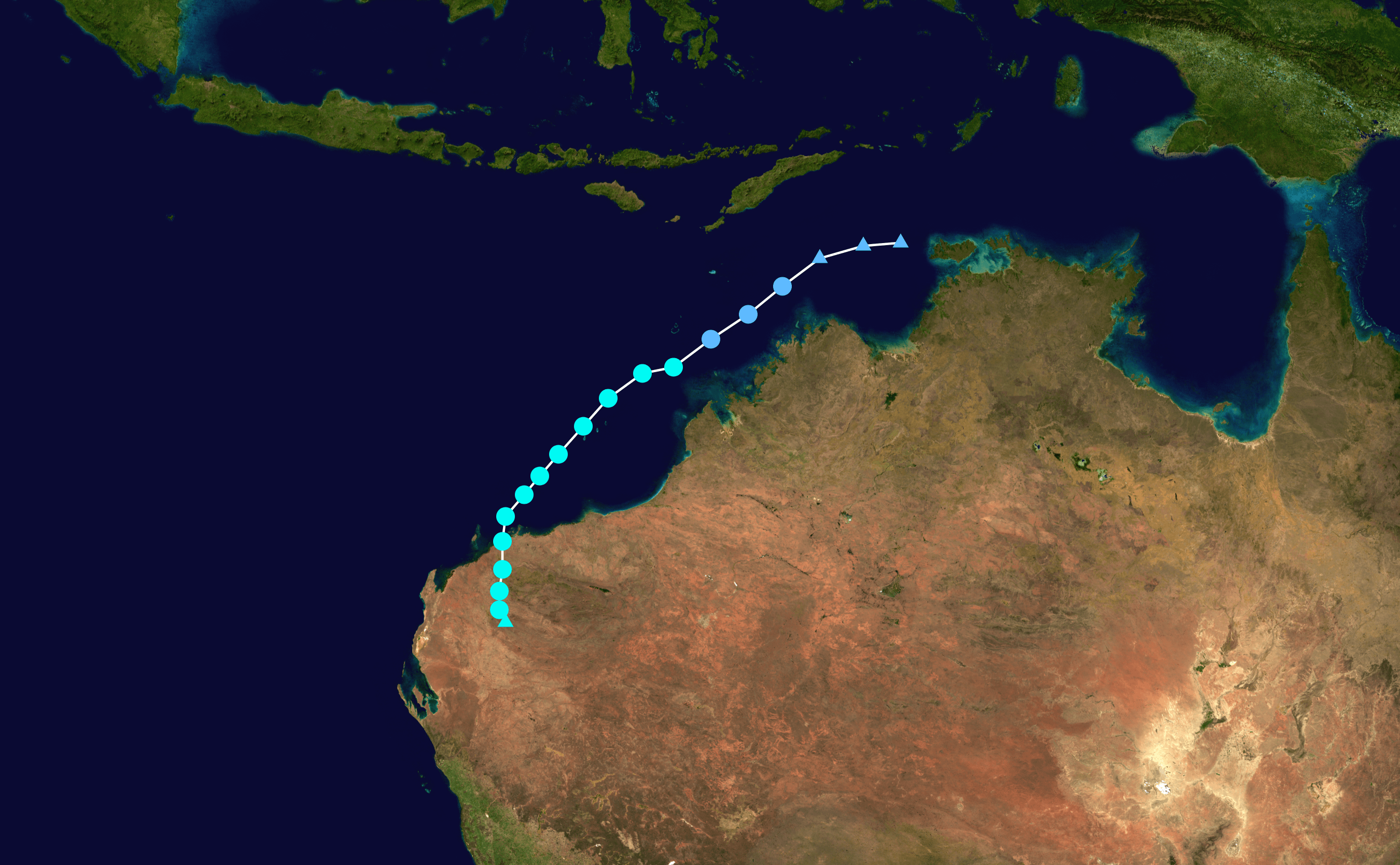
- Duration: 6 January – 10 January
- Peak intensity: 140 km/h (85 mph) (10-min); 960 hPa (mbar)

A tropical low formed north of Northern Territory and tracked roughly parallel to the coast. On 7 January, TCWC Perth started issuing tropical cyclone advisories on this system. The low became Tropical Cyclone Clare when it was located 250 km north of Cape Leveque or 430 km north of Broome. A steady strengthening trend continued and Clare peaked as a 139 km/h (75 kn) storm, or a Category 3 cyclone on the Australian scale, with a minimum pressure of 960 hPa at the centre of the system. On 9 January the cyclone made landfall near Karratha and Dampier next day, and dissipated on the 10th as it continued inland. On 12 December 2006, the Bureau of Meteorology announced that the name "Clare" would be retired, and will never be used for an Australian Cyclone ever again.

In preparation of the storm, 1,500 people were evacuated, while incoming flights and mining operations were closed. Although sustained wind speeds of 131 km/h and gusts of up to 142 km/h were recorded, the towns affected by TC Clare escaped with only minor structural damage. The precipitation associated with Ex-Tropical Cyclone Clare caused extensive flooding in the towns of Walkaway and Lake Grace over the weekend of 14–15 January. Because it made landfall at low tide, storm surge damage was negligible. Overall, damage was estimated to be at least A$5 million (US$3.2 million), and Clare was responsible for no deaths.

=== Tropical Cyclone Daryl ===
- Category 2 tropical cyclone (Australian scale)
- Tropical storm (SSHWS)
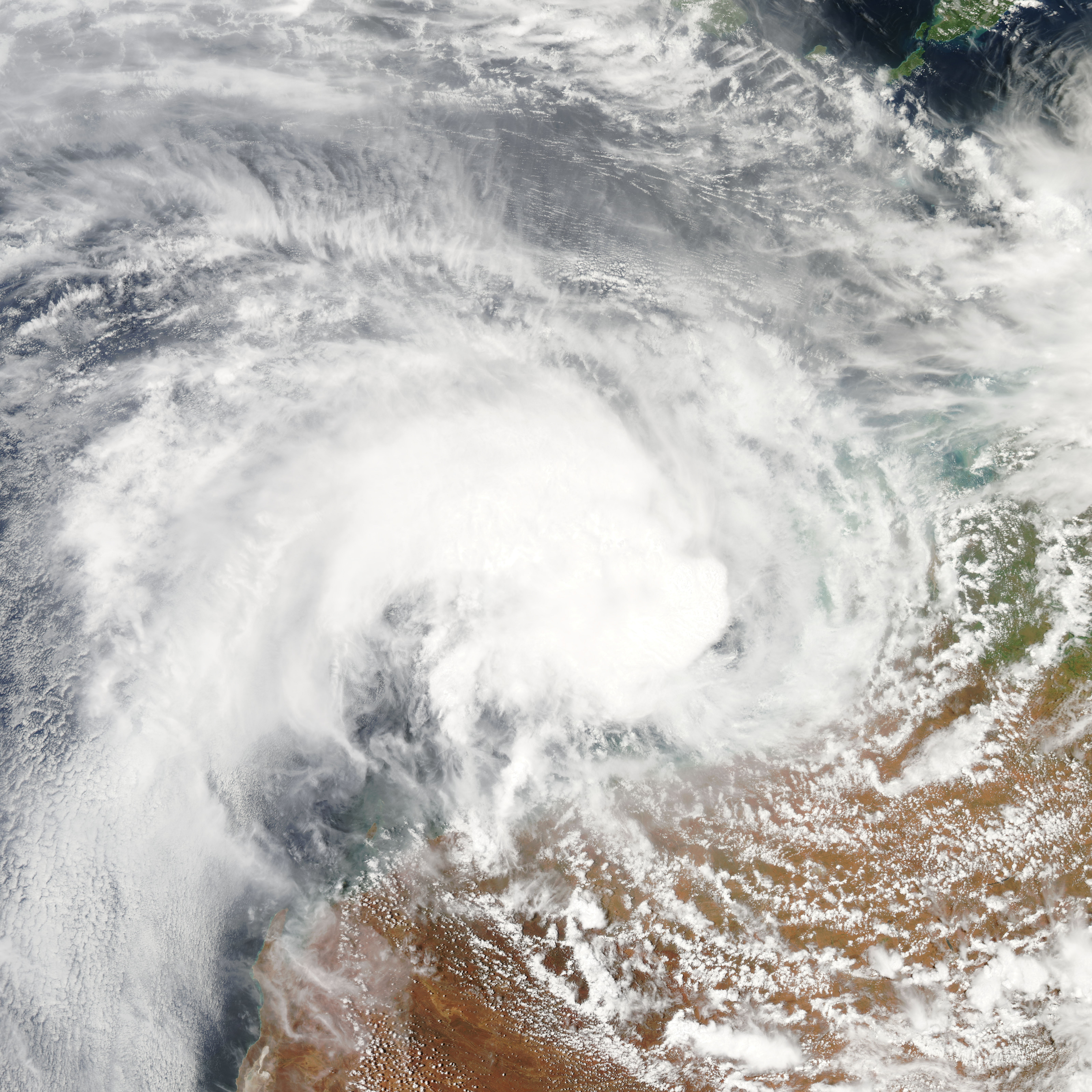
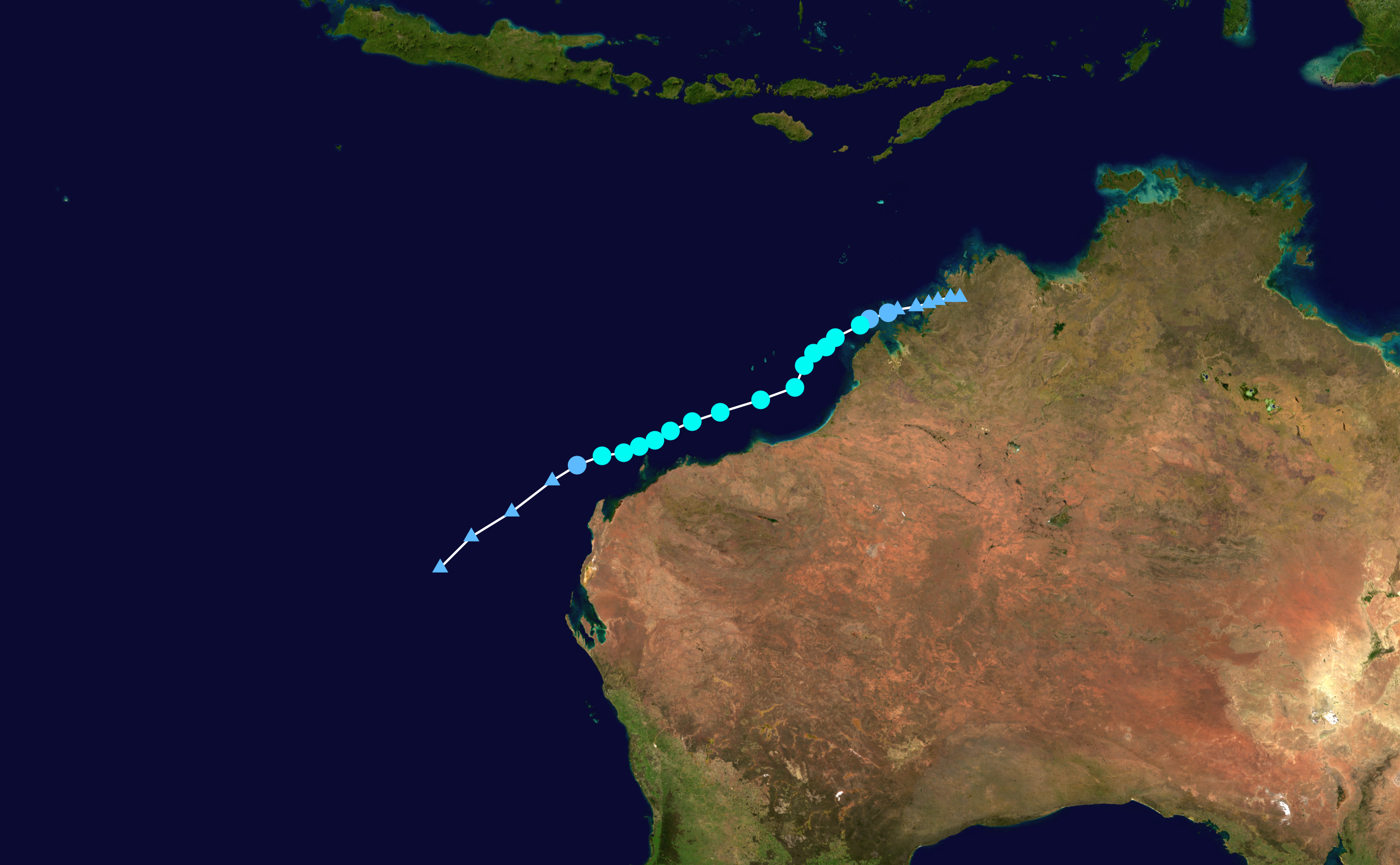
- Duration: 18 January – 22 January
- Peak intensity: 100 km/h (65 mph) (10-min); 976 hPa (mbar)

On 17 January, TCWC Perth started issuing tropical cyclone advisories for a tropical low overland. The low tracked into Kuri Bay next day and developed into Tropical Cyclone Daryl. It continued to strengthen, and on 21 January briefly became a Severe Tropical Cyclone operationally but was downgraded to a 55kt Tropical Cyclone following the end of season analysis. Over the next two days, Daryl tracked parallel to the West Australian coast, mostly as a Category 2 system. Daryl continued tracking in a south-westerly direction before being downgraded to a low-pressure system on 23 January. The cyclone did not cross the coast.

=== Tropical Low 07U ===
- Tropical low (Australian scale)
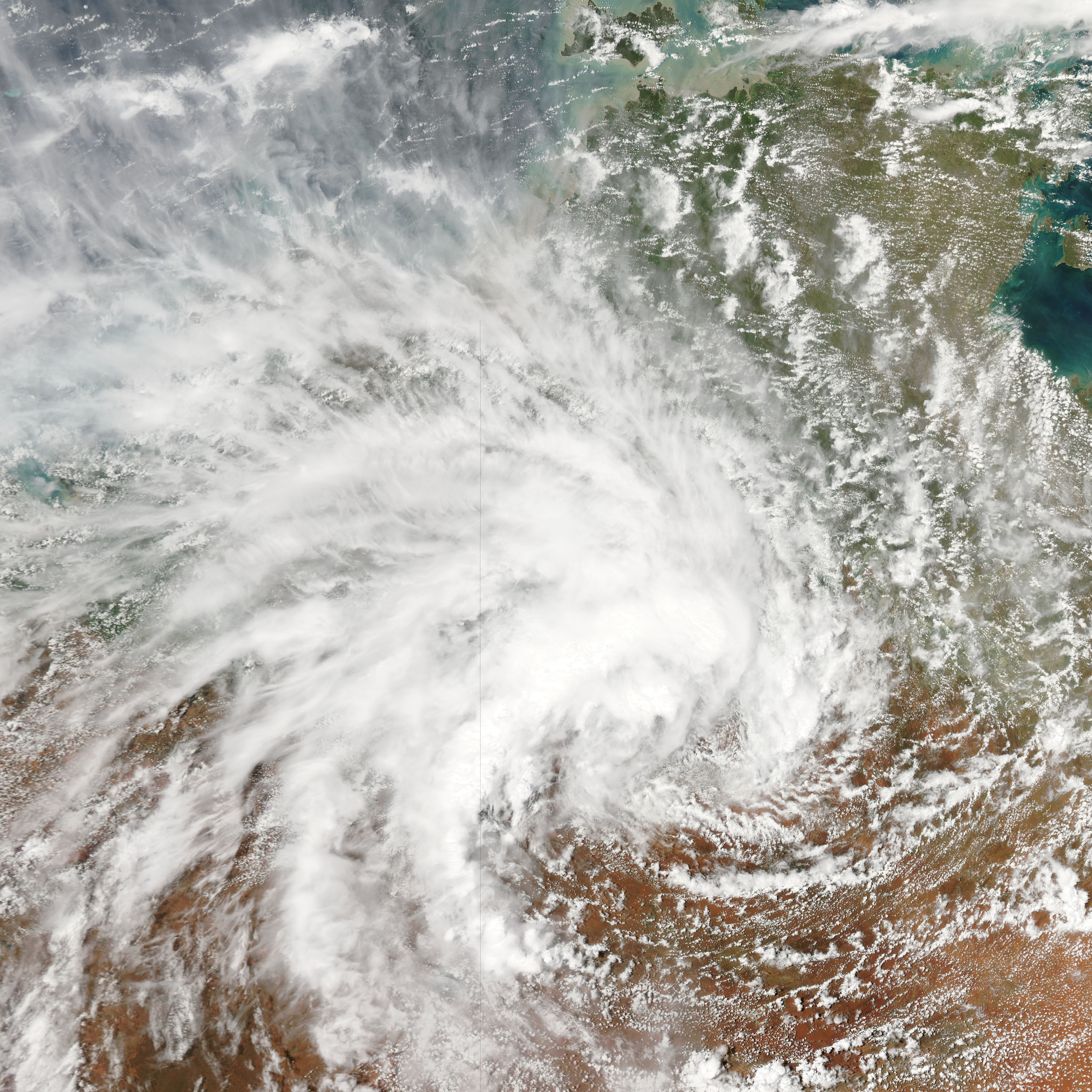
- Duration: 24 January – 1 February
- Peak intensity: 55 km/h (35 mph) (10-min); 989 hPa (mbar)

A tropical low developed off the north coast of the Top End in late January. It made landfall in the Darwin area and drifted down the western border of the Northern Territory. The low brought heavy rainfall to many parts of the western Northern Territory. The low continued to move south through the Victoria River District and into the Tanami Desert. The Victoria Highway was cut by floodwaters, isolating Timber Creek and the Victoria River Crossing. On 31 January, the low deepened producing near gale-force winds.

- Significant Weather Summaries from Australian Bureau of Meteorology
- A comprehensive discussion of the low
- An animated satellite picture loop for the week 26 January to 1 February

=== Severe Tropical Cyclone Jim ===
- Category 3 severe tropical cyclone (Australian scale)
- Category 1 tropical cyclone (SSHWS)
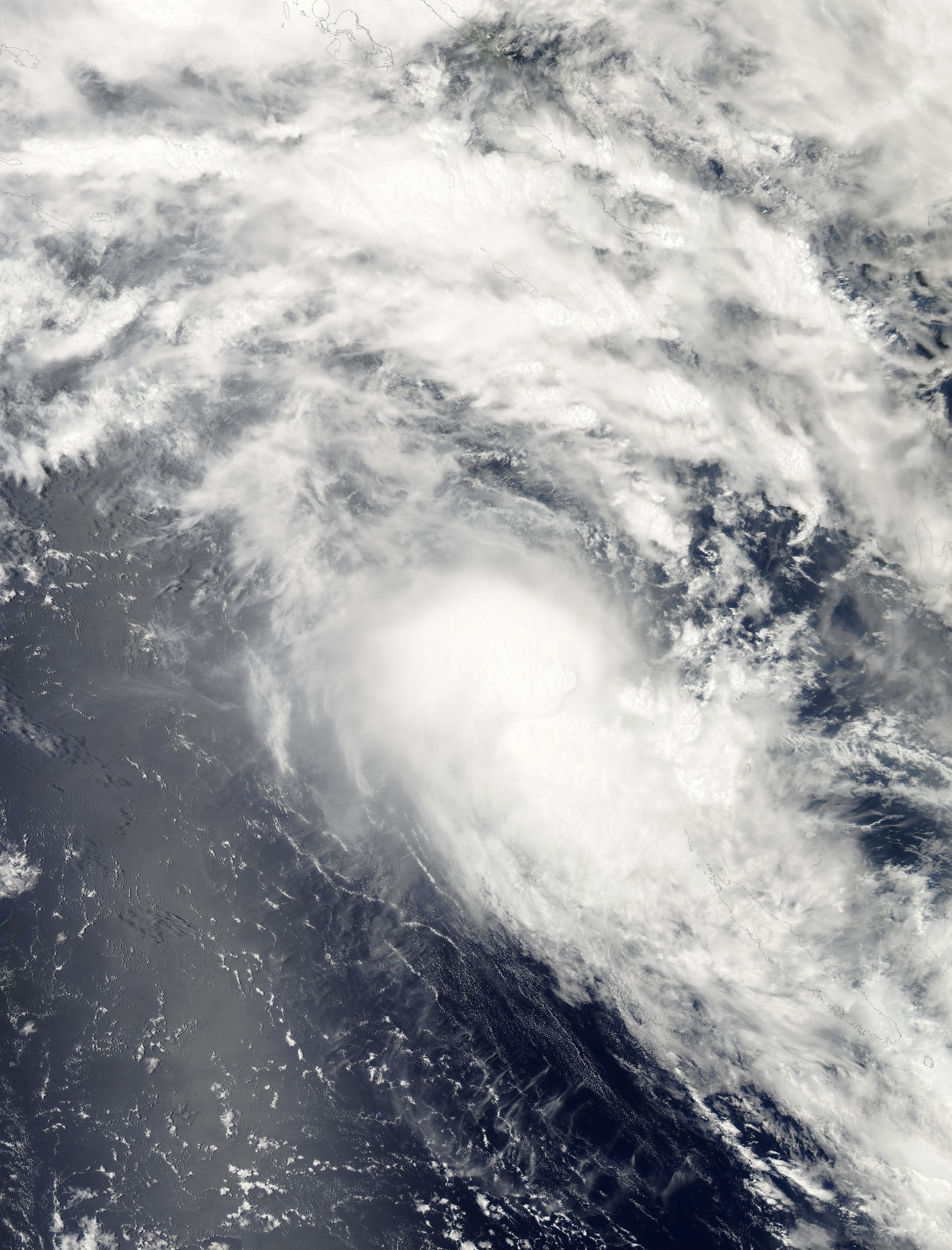
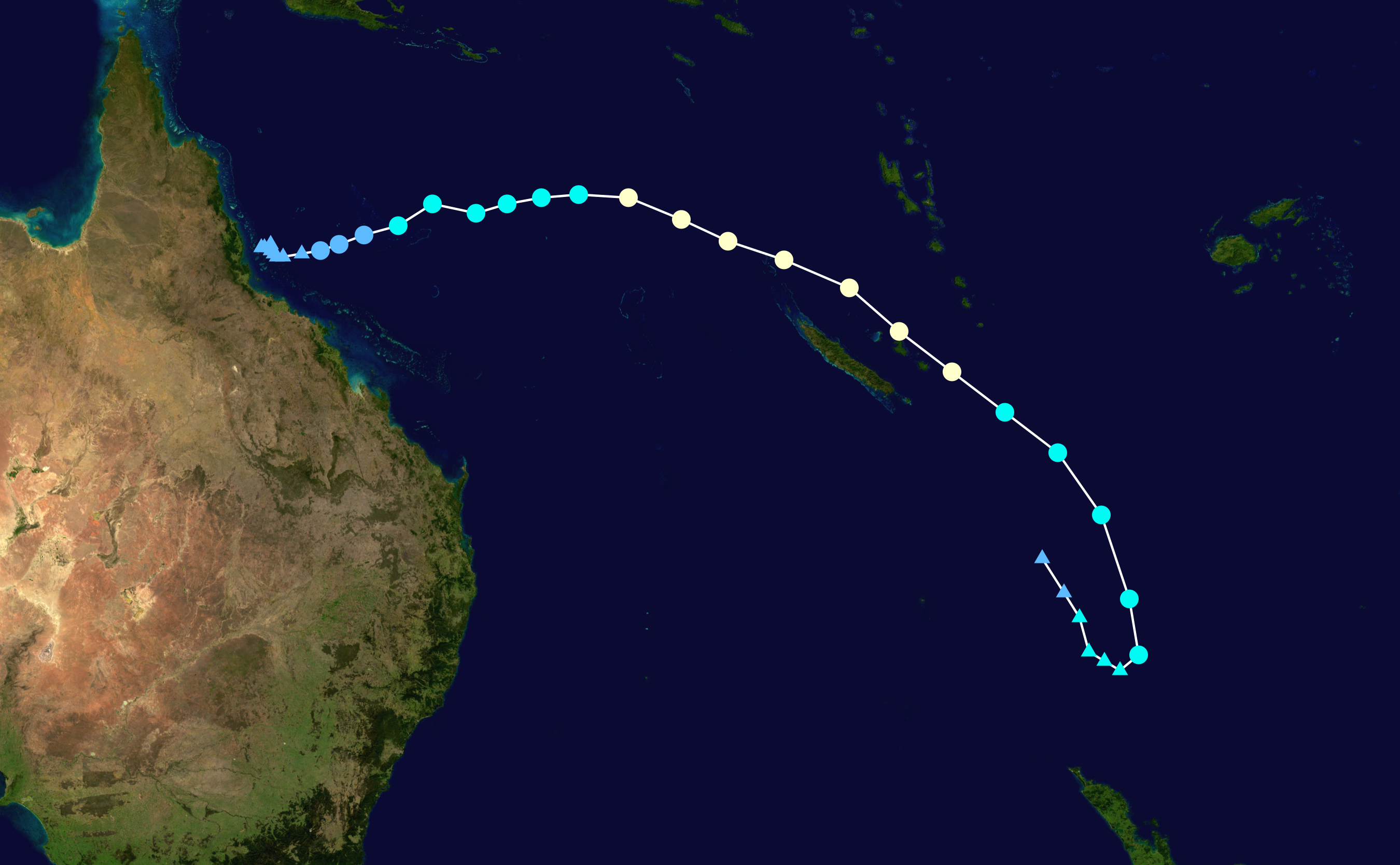
- Duration: 25 January – 30 January (exited basin)
- Peak intensity: 120 km/h (75 mph) (10-min); 970 hPa (mbar)

On 24 January, a broad area of low pressure developed near the coast of Queensland after a monsoonal trough passed through the region. Northeasterly winds flowing into the system quickly increased convection, resulting in heavy rainfall over coastal regions of Queensland. The slow movement of the developing low continued through 26 January before turning northeast in response to a mid-level ridge to the north. On 28 January, the JTWC began monitoring the system as Tropical Storm 10P and shortly after, the Bureau of Meteorology classified the storm as a Category 1 cyclone and gave it the name Jim.

Jim continued to intensify as it steadily tracked east-northeastward. Upper-level outflow associated with the storm gradually improved as the cyclone neared the edge of the Bureau of Meteorology's warning area. Shortly before crossing 160°E on 30 January, Jim intensified into a Category 3 cyclone, with winds reaching 120 km/h (75 mph) 10-minute sustained). At the same time, the JTWC assessed the system to have become a Category 1 equivalent with winds of 120 km/h (75 mph) 1-minute sustained). After crossing 160°E, warning responsibility of the cyclone was given to the RSMC in Nadi, Fiji. Upon entering their area of responsibility, Jim sharply turned southeast, attaining a peak intensity with winds of 150 km/h (93 mph) 10-minute sustained) as it brushed New Caledonia. By 1 February, the storm had transitioned into an extratropical cyclone, dissipating a few days later.

As the storm was developing, torrential rainfall affected portions of coastal Queensland between 26 and 27 January. In a 24-hour span, 258 mm (10.2 in) of rain fell in Home Hill, leading to minor flooding. On 28 January, the cyclone brushed Flinders Reef, Willis Island and Lihou Reef, bringing winds up to 65 km/h (40 mph) to all three areas.

=== Tropical Cyclone Kate ===
- Category 2 tropical cyclone (Australian scale)
- Tropical storm (SSHWS)
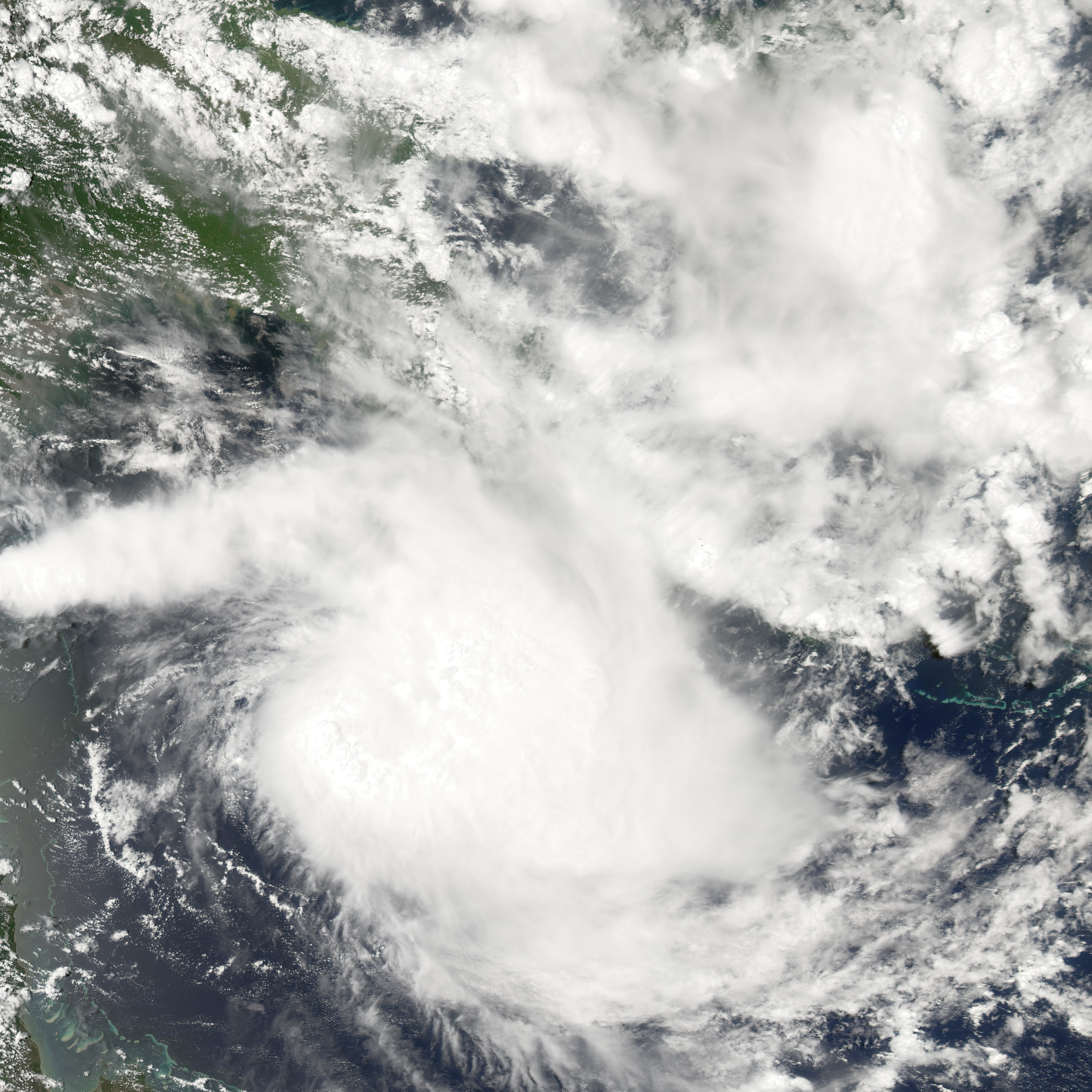
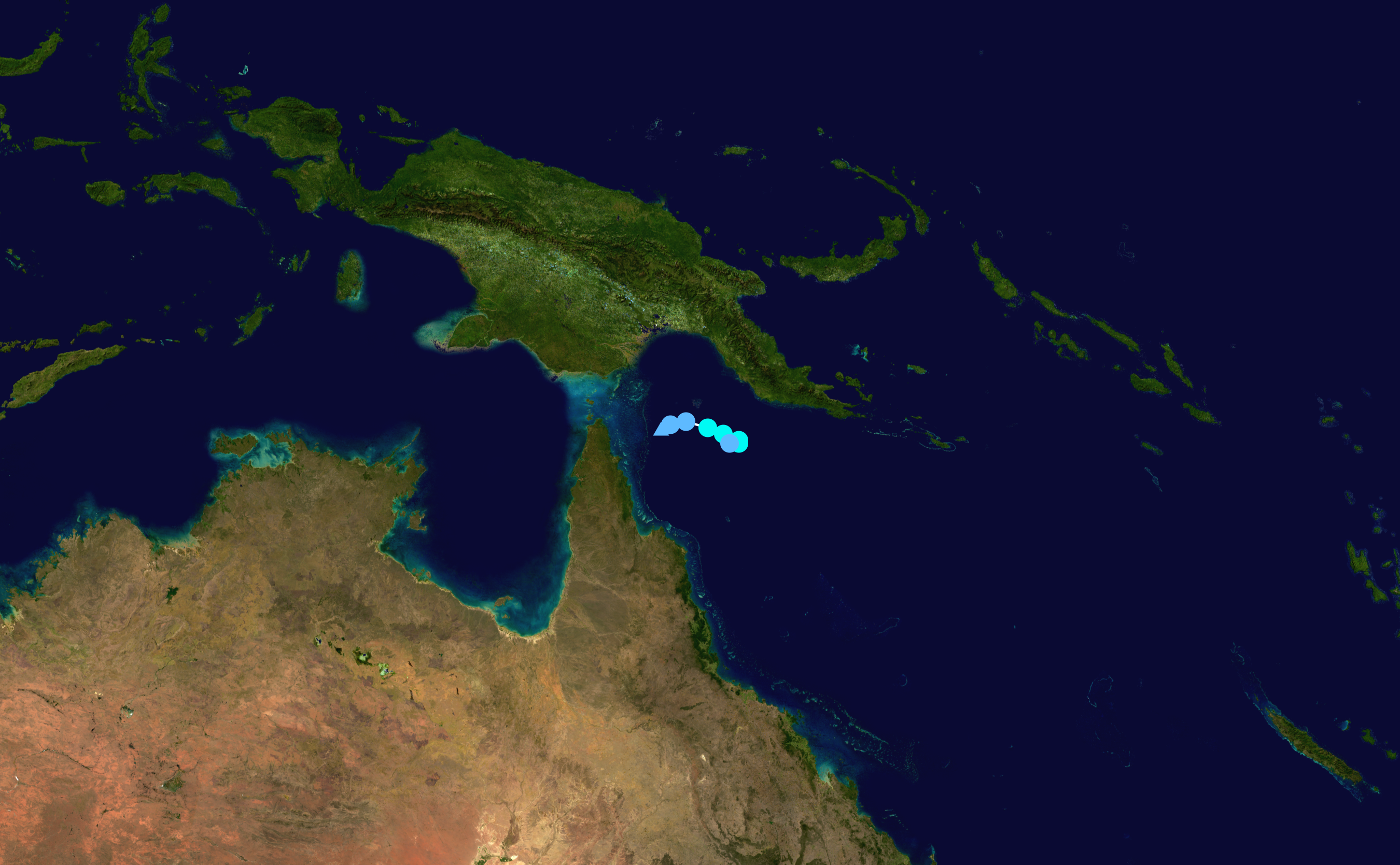
- Duration: 22 February – 24 February
- Peak intensity: 95 km/h (60 mph) (10-min); 985 hPa (mbar)

Cyclone Kate originated from an area of low pressure that was first identified on 22 February 2006, within a monsoonal trough. The system rapidly intensified throughout the day, with the Australian Bureau of Meteorology issuing their first advisory on the system that evening. Upon being classified, the system was immediately declared Tropical Cyclone Kate. At the same time, the Joint Typhoon Warning Center (JTWC) also began issuing advisories on the system, designating it as Tropical Cyclone 13P. The system remained nearly stationary over the northwestern Coral Sea. Early on 23 February, the storm attained its peak intensity with winds of 95 km/h (59 mph) 10-minute sustained) and a barometric pressure of 985 hPa (mbar). However, the JTWC assessed the system to have been slightly weaker, attaining peak winds of 85 km/h (53 mph) 1-minute sustained). Kate stalled shortly thereafter and began to weaken due to increasing wind shear. Rapid weakening took place throughout the day, and JTWC declared the system dissipated early on 24 February. The Bureau of Meteorology downgraded Kate to a tropical low around the same time, although they continued to monitor the storm for several more hours before reporting that it had dissipated over open waters.

Upon the cyclone's formation, the Bureau of Meteorology warned vessels to avoid the storm in anticipation of rough seas and winds gusting to 125 km/h (78 mph). Although the storm did not pose much of a threat to Queensland, officials urged residents to ensure their disaster kits were ready and that preparations for a moderate storm, such as storing lose outdoor objects and clearing gutters, had been completed. While the storm had no direct impact on land, large swells affected most of the Queensland coastline. In the Shire of Noosa, six surfers sustained serious injuries after wading into turbulent waters. Waves up to 1.8 m (5.9 ft) tossed the six surfers, leaving them with injuries ranging from broken noses and fractured ankles to head wounds from surfboards. The waves also caused additional beach erosion to parts of Papua New Guinea previously impacted by Cyclone Ingrid.

=== Tropical Cyclone Emma ===
- Category 1 tropical cyclone (Australian scale)
- Tropical storm (SSHWS)
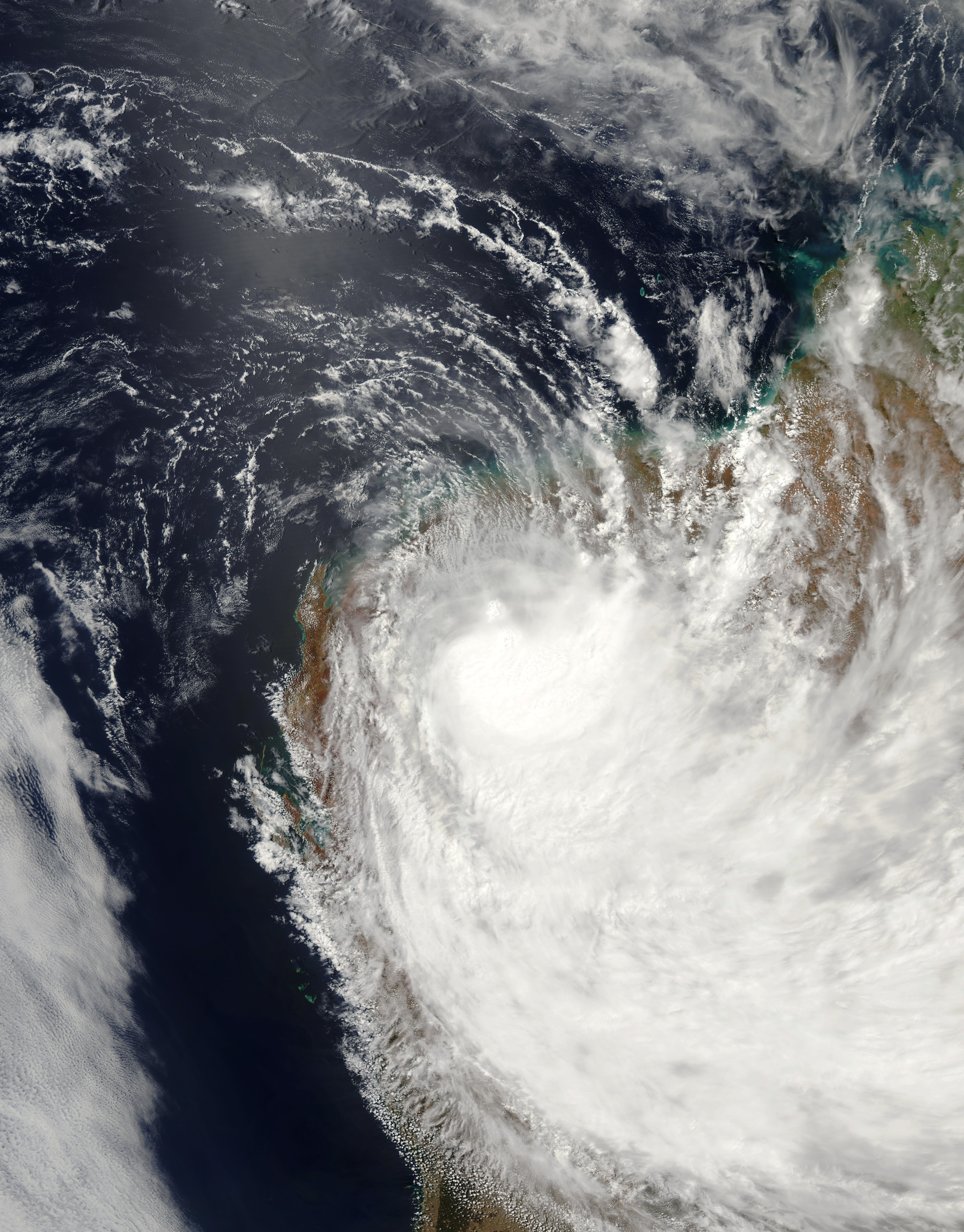
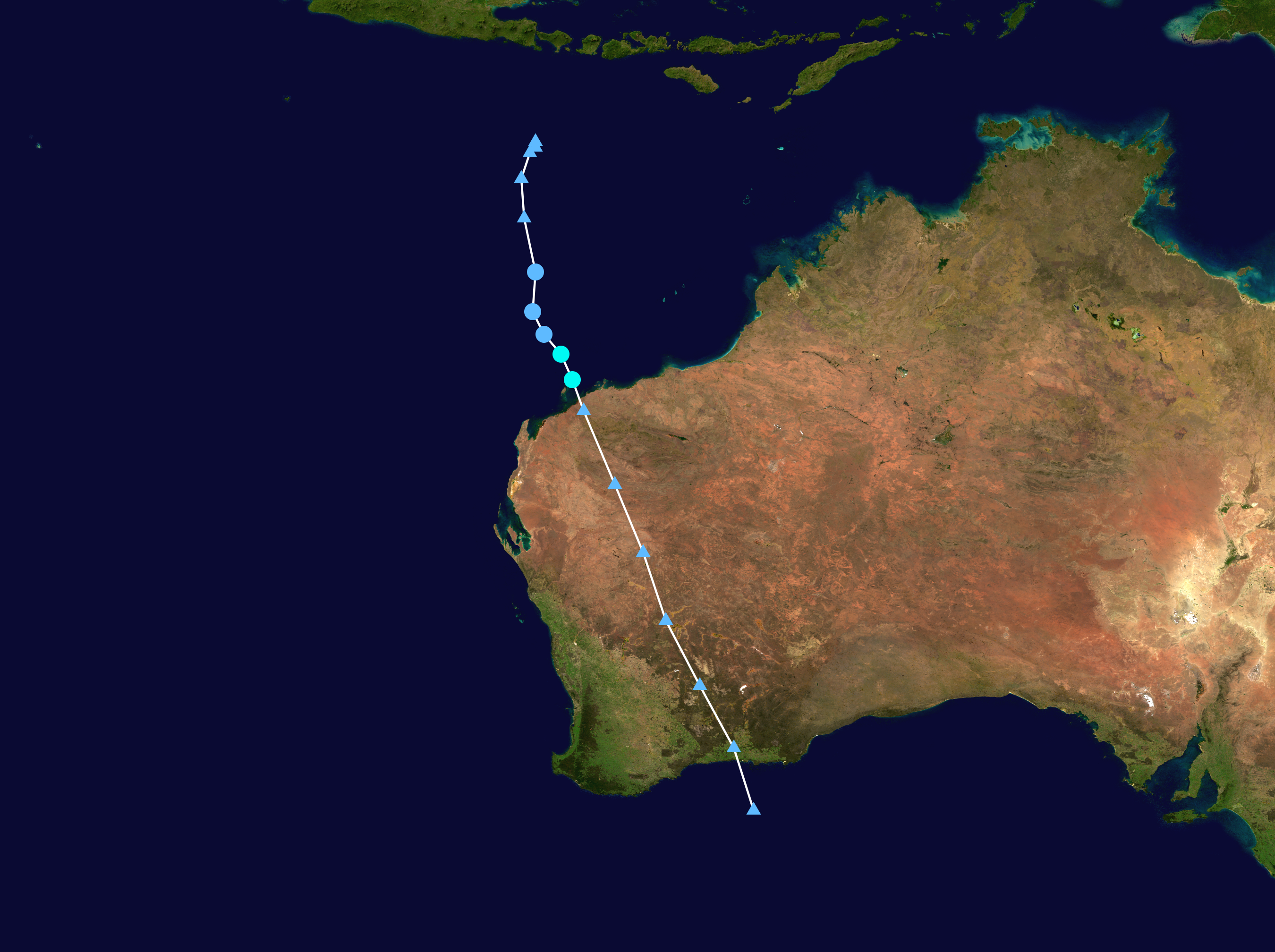
- Duration: 25 February – 1 March
- Peak intensity: 75 km/h (45 mph) (10-min); 988 hPa (mbar)

The ninth storm of the season, Cyclone Emma, originated from a southward-moving area of low pressure that was first identified on 25 February. Although classified tropical, the structure of the system represented that of a monsoonal storm. However, low wind shear and well-developed outflow gradually allowed convection to develop near the center of circulation. As the system near the Pilbara coastline of Western Australia on 27 February, it intensified into a Category 1 cyclone and attained peak winds of 75 km/h (47 mph) 10-minute sustained). The JTWC, however, reported the storm to have been slightly weaker, attaining peak winds of 65 km/h (40 mph) 1-minute sustained). After moving inland near Mardie, Emma weakened to a tropical low but became exceedingly large, with the cloud cover from the storm encompassing most of Western Australia. The remnants of the weak storm persisted until 1 March, at which time it dissipated over the Great Australian Bight.

Although a weak storm, rainfall from Emma caused flooding in numerous parts of Western Australia. In Karratha, six people required rescue after their cars became stranded in flood waters. The most significant damage took place along the Murchison River which swelled to roughly 16 km (9.9 mi) in width. Although only one town was threatened by the river, large areas of farmland were inundated by the expanding river, leading to substantial agricultural losses. Despite the extensive flooding, no fatalities were reported as a result of Emma.

=== Tropical Low ===
- Tropical low (Australian scale)
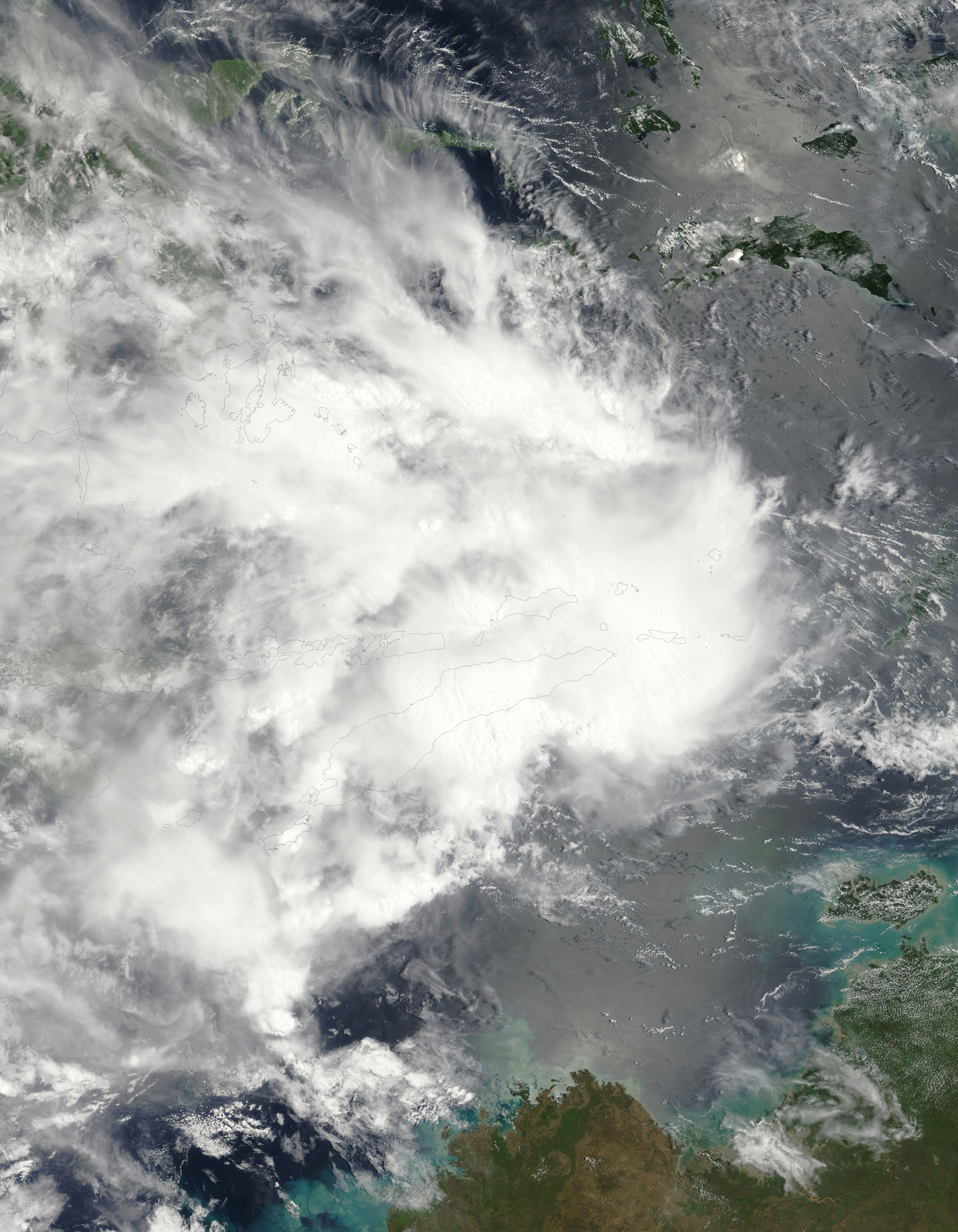
- Duration: 28 February – 6 March
- Peak intensity: 55 km/h (35 mph) (10-min); 998 hPa (mbar)

A tropical low formed in the Arafura Sea north of Nhulunbuy on 24 February. It moved northwest into the Banda Sea and deepened during the next two days. Through the remainder of February it moved slowly south-southwest into the Timor Sea. The low persisted into March but did not reach cyclone intensity. A cyclone watch was issued for a portion of Western Australia though the maximum sustained winds of the low were just 25 knots.

- Significant Weather Summaries from Australian Bureau of Meteorology

=== Severe Tropical Cyclone Larry ===
- Category 5 severe tropical cyclone (Australian scale)
- Category 4 tropical cyclone (SSHWS)
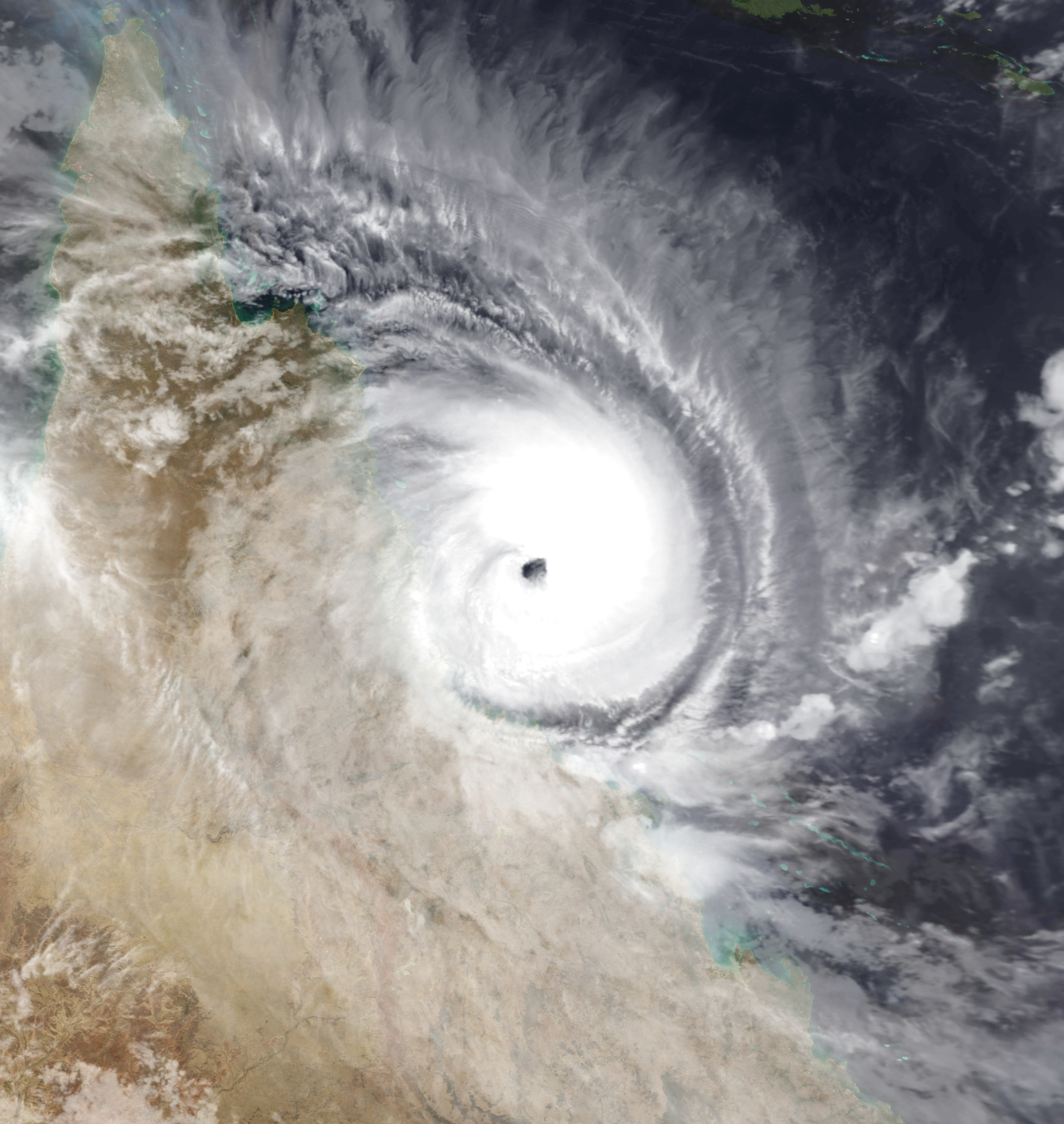
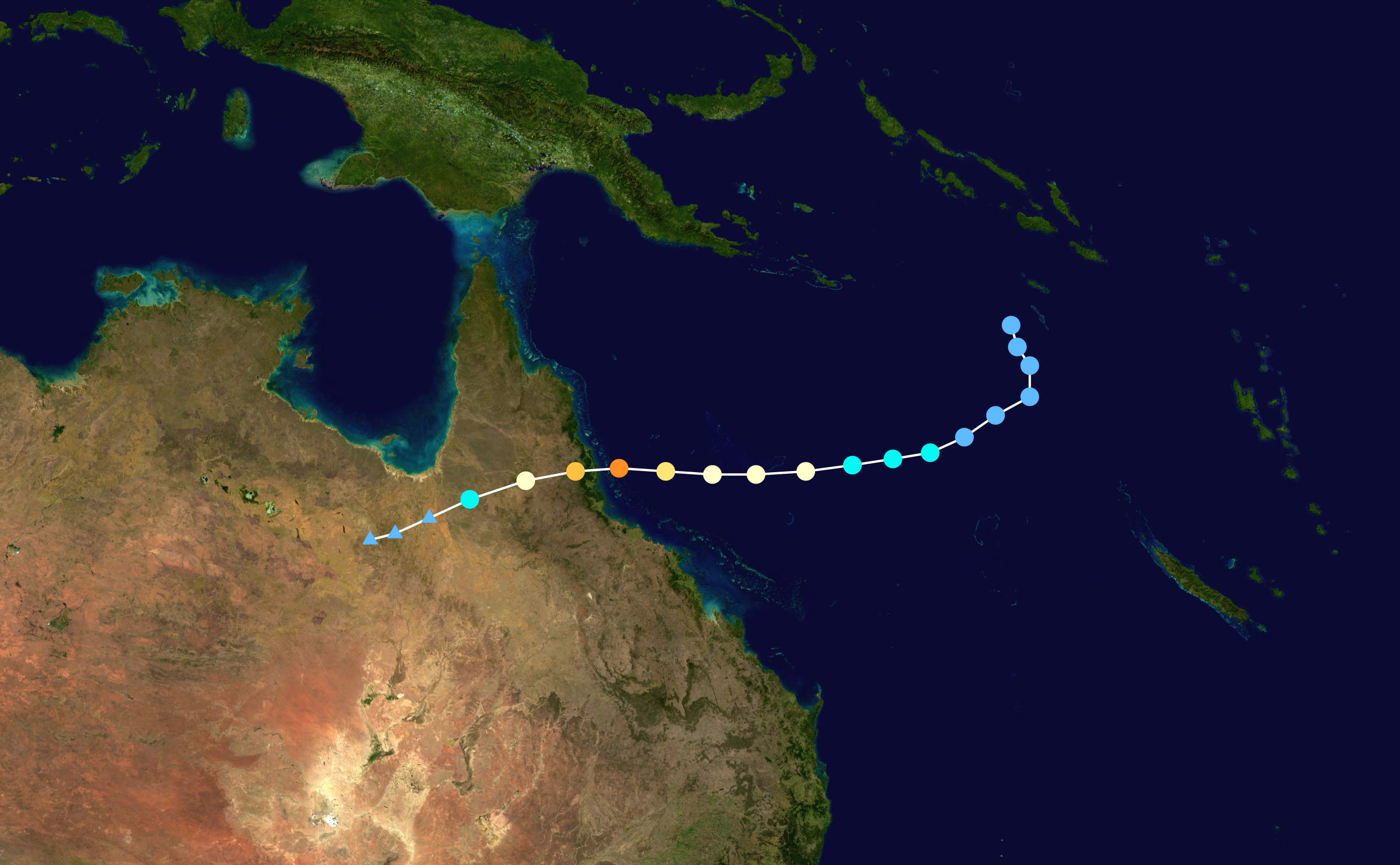
- Duration: 16 March – 21 March
- Peak intensity: 205 km/h (125 mph) (10-min); 949 hPa (mbar)

TCWC Brisbane issued a gale warning for a Tropical Low in the Coral Sea on 16 March. On the same day, RSMC Nadi classified it as a deepening tropical depression (15F). On 17 March, the tropical low strengthened into Tropical Cyclone Larry. Larry moved towards the Queensland coast and gradually intensified to Category 5 on the Australian scale, weakening slightly before making landfall on 20 March over Innisfail. Larry was downgraded to a tropical low that night.

Cyclone Larry is considered to be the worst cyclone to hit Queensland since 1931. The total damage caused by Larry was estimated to be A$1 billion (2006).

=== Severe Tropical Cyclone Floyd ===
- Category 4 severe tropical cyclone (Australian scale)
- Category 4 tropical cyclone (SSHWS)
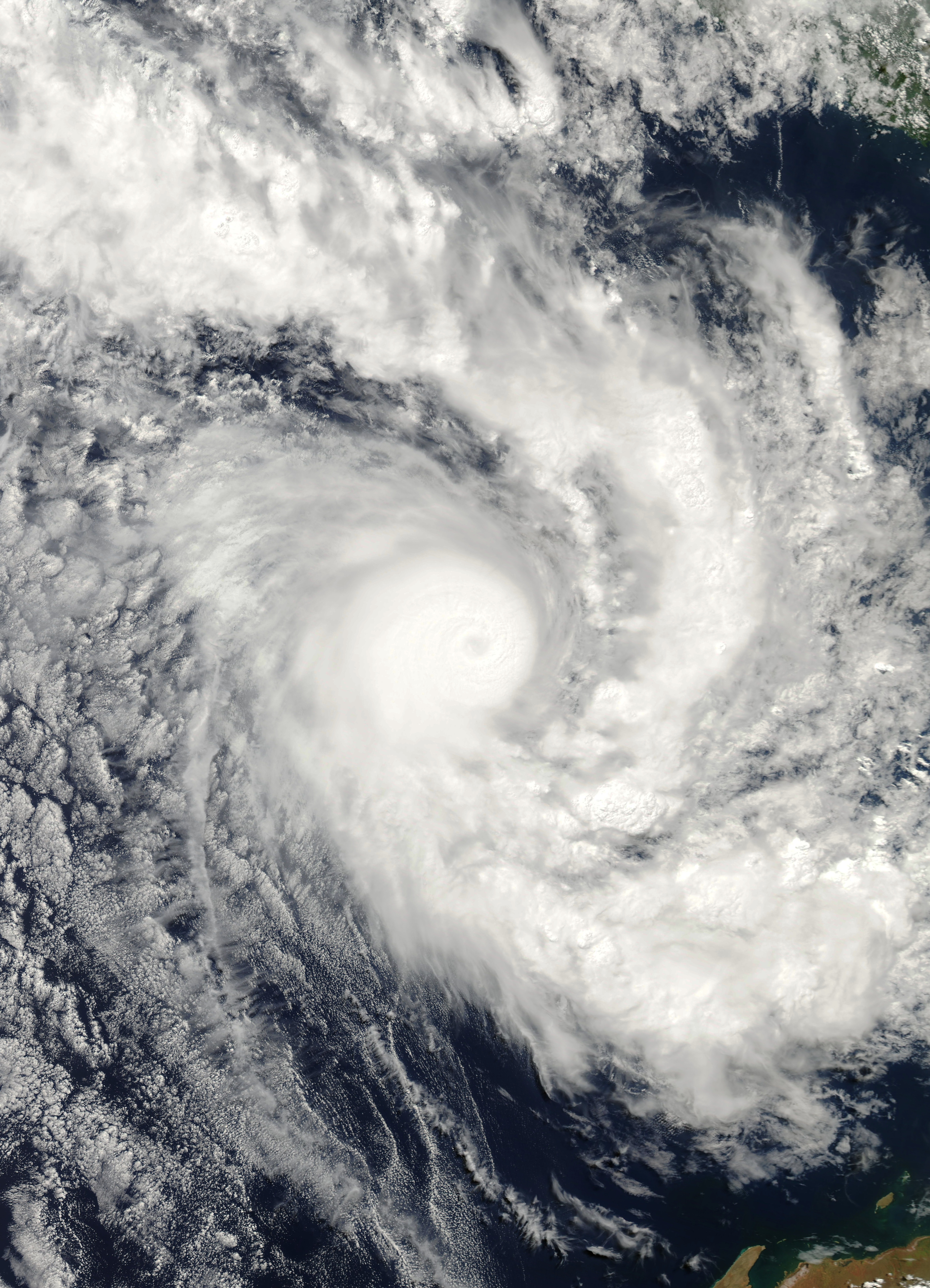
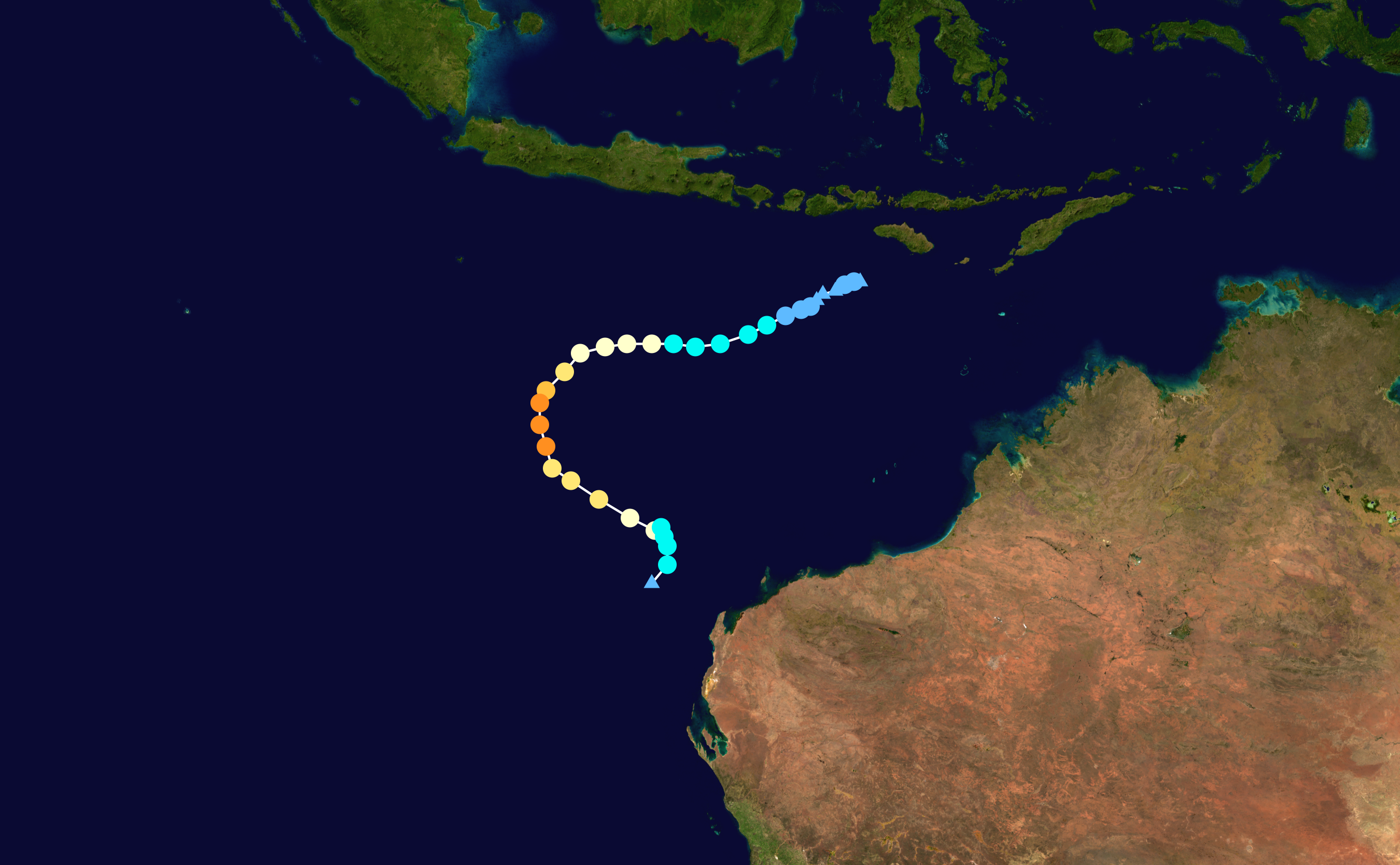
- Duration: 18 March – 27 March
- Peak intensity: 195 km/h (120 mph) (10-min); 916 hPa (mbar)

On 21 March 2006, TCWC Perth started issuing advisories on a Tropical Low. That low later strengthened into Tropical Cyclone Floyd as a Category 1 on the Australian scale. Overnight on 22 March, it became a severe tropical cyclone. Strengthening further, Floyd reached Australian Category 4 at 8 p.m. AWST (1200 UTC) on 23 March. Floyd attained its peak intensity with maximum sustained winds up to 105 knots (10-minute average) on 24 March. A steady weakening trend occurred thereafter and Floyd became a tropical low about 285 kilometres west northwest of Exmouth on 27 March.

=== Severe Tropical Cyclone Wati ===
- Category 3 severe tropical cyclone (Australian scale)
- Category 1 tropical cyclone (SSHWS)
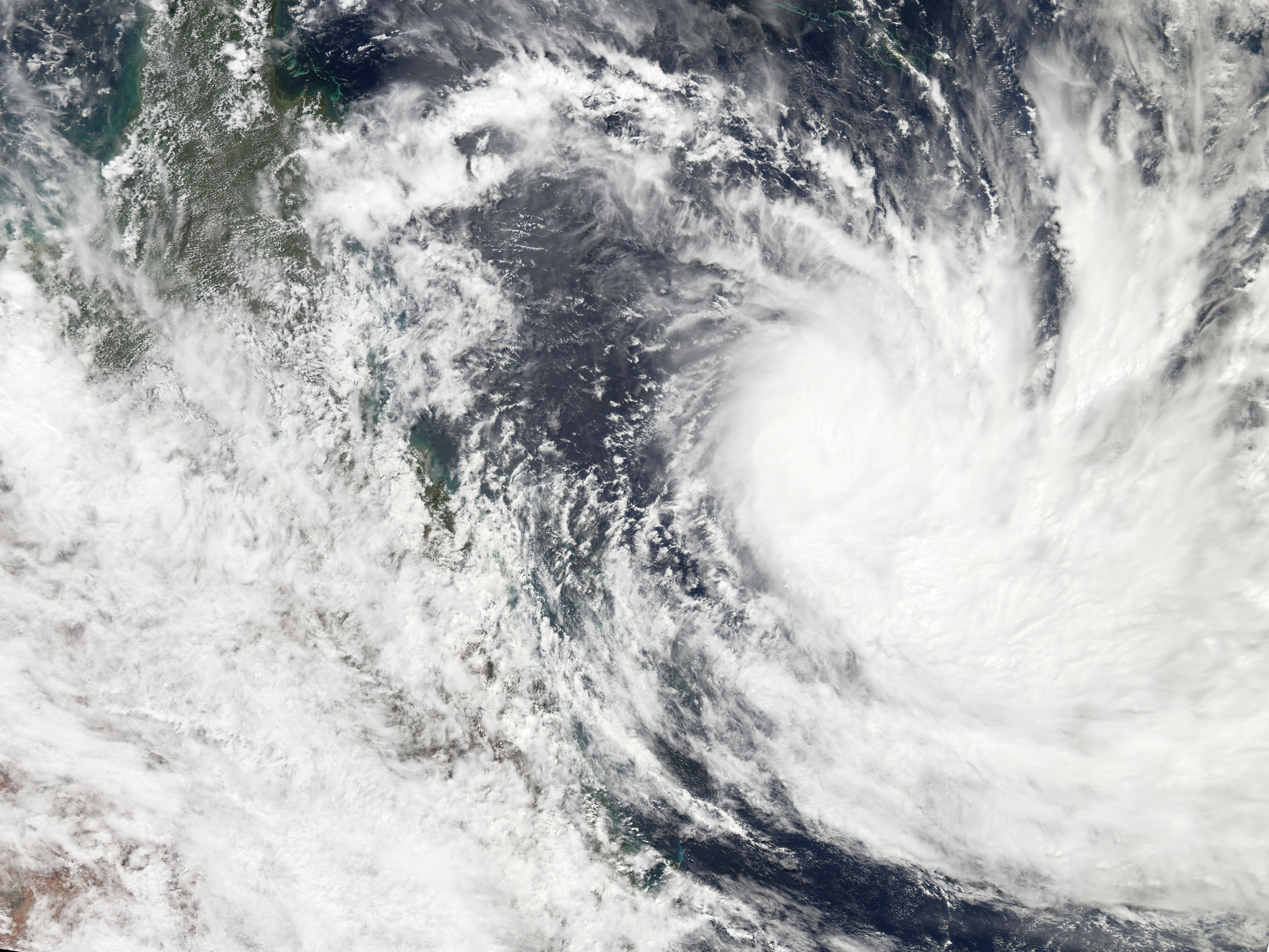
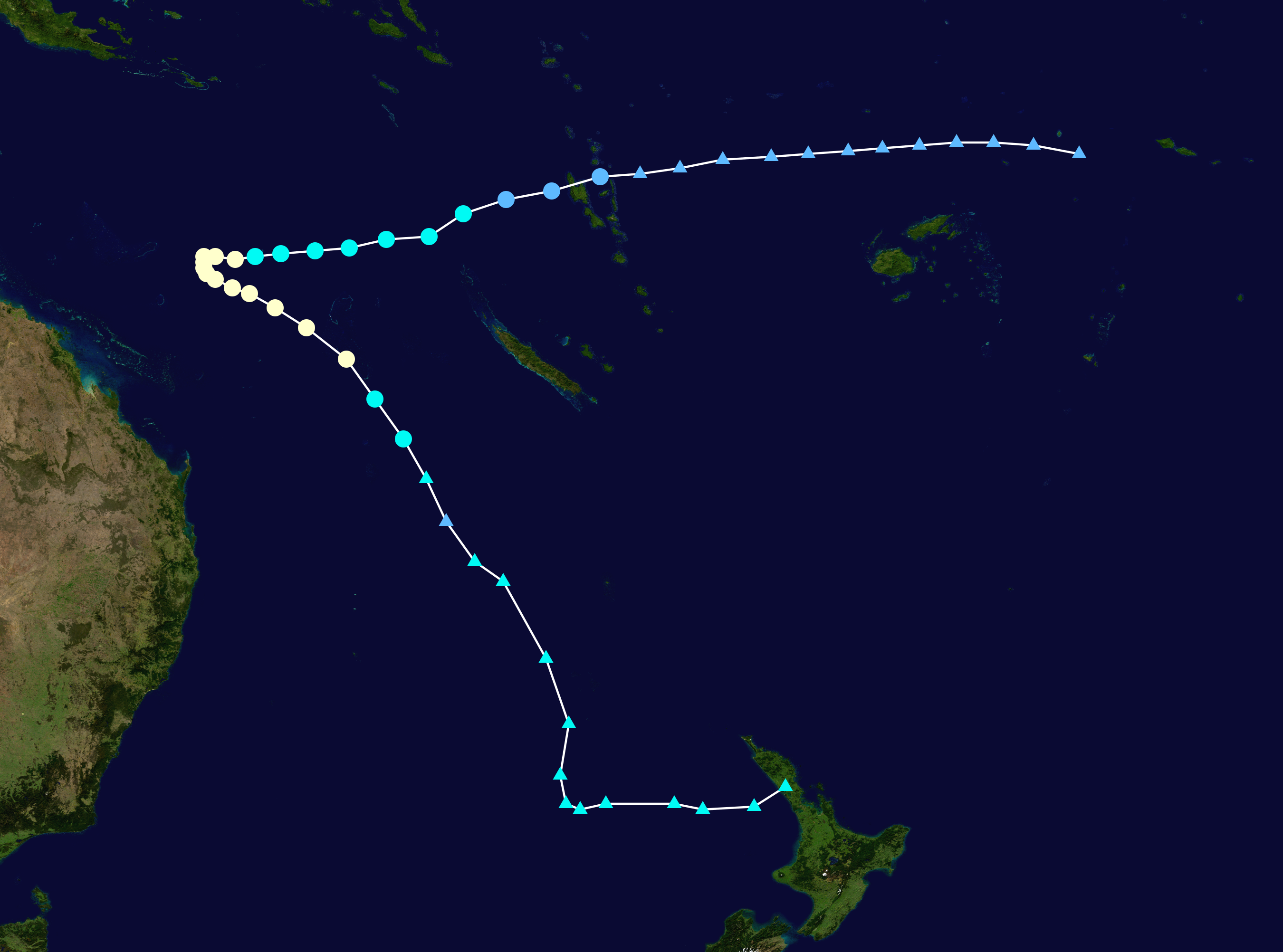
- Duration: 20 March – 24 March
- Peak intensity: 155 km/h (100 mph) (10-min); 955 hPa (mbar)

Severe Tropical Cyclone Wati originated in the South Pacific region and moved into Brisbane's area of responsibility in late March. It later moved to the south-east where cyclone watches were issued for Lord Howe Island and cyclone warnings for Norfolk Island.

=== Severe Tropical Cyclone Glenda ===
- Category 5 severe tropical cyclone (Australian scale)
- Category 4 tropical cyclone (SSHWS)
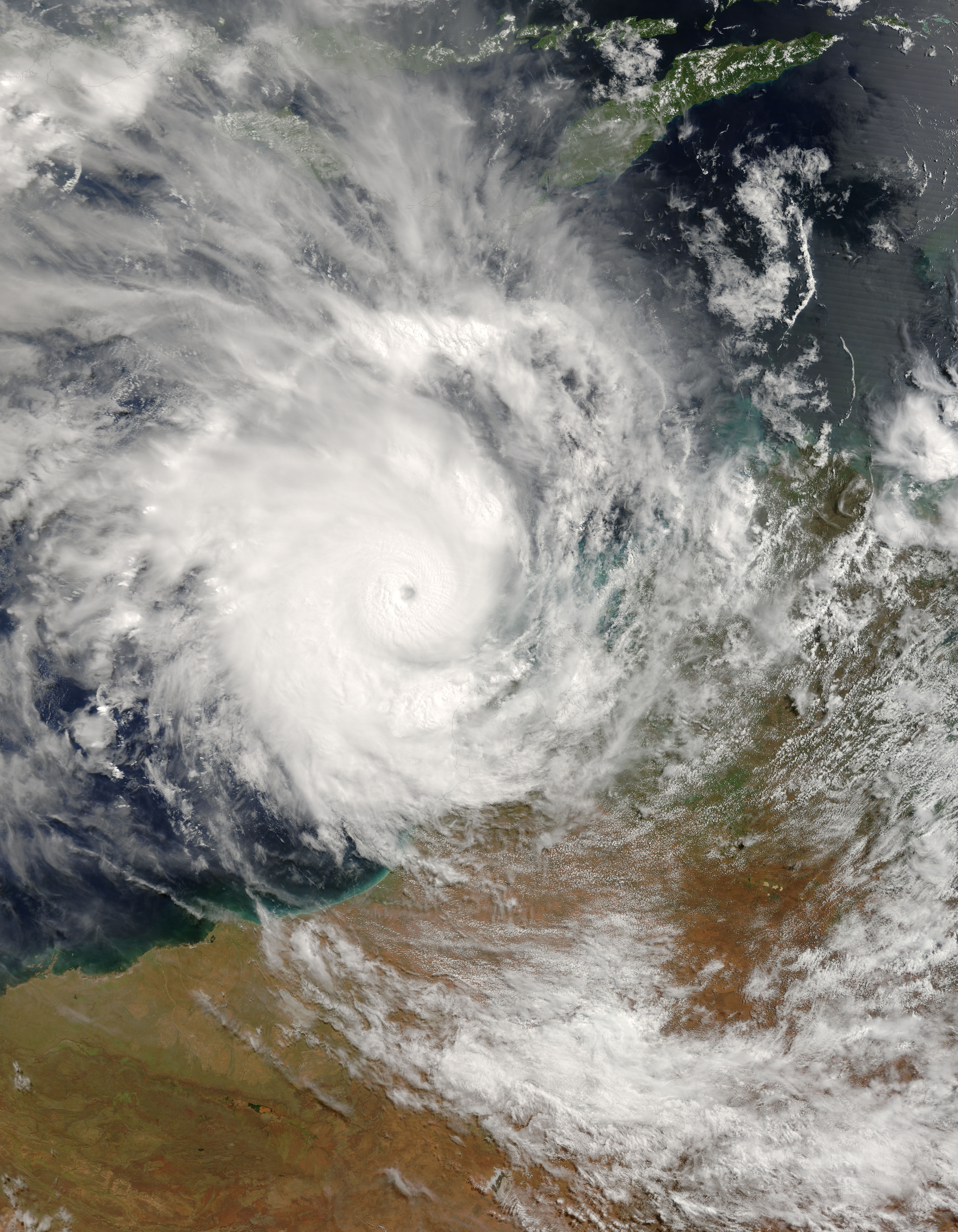
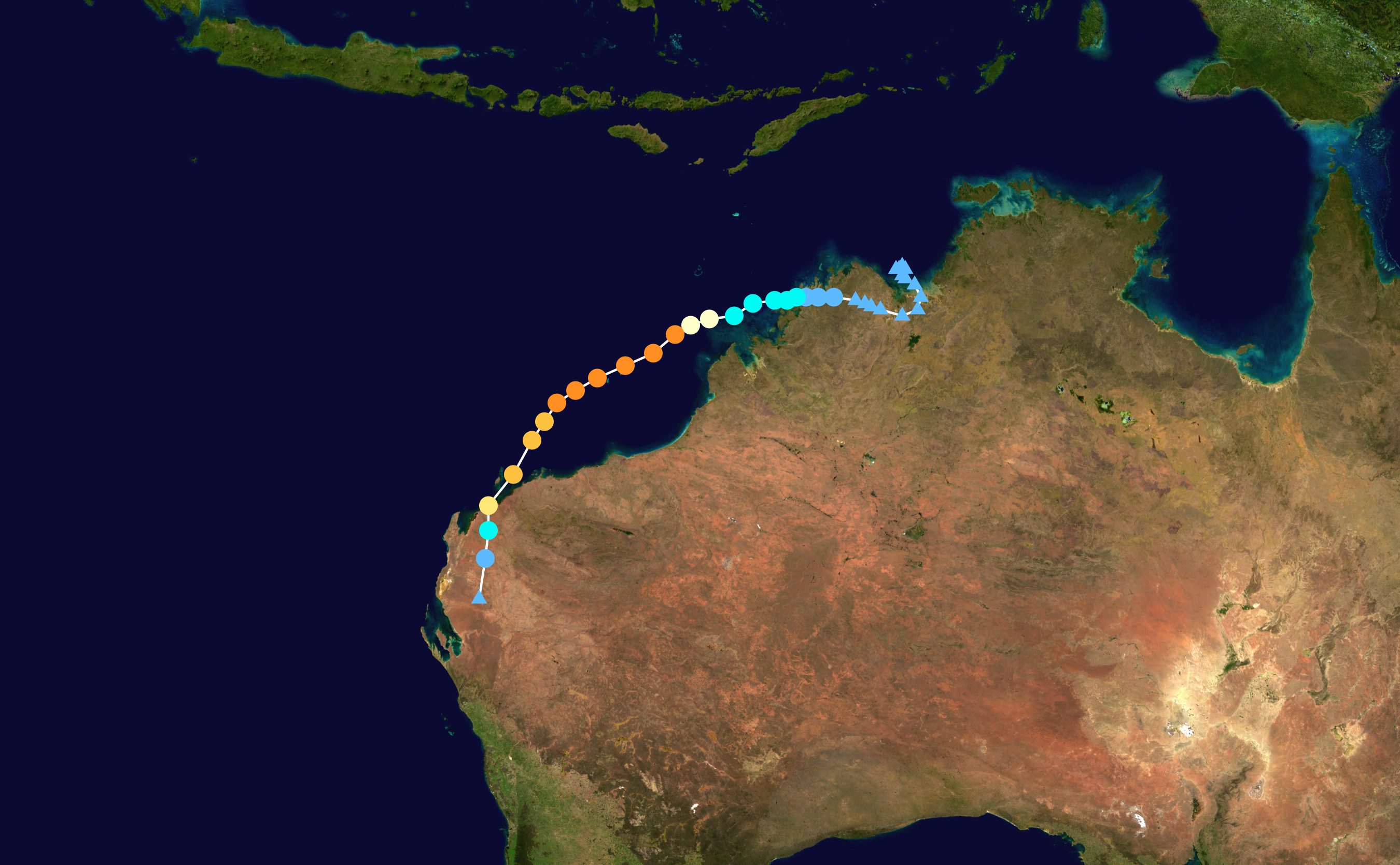
- Duration: 22 March – 31 March
- Peak intensity: 205 km/h (125 mph) (10-min); 910 hPa (mbar)

Cyclone Glenda began as a tropical low on 15 March in the Gulf of Carpentaria. The precursor disturbance drifted over Top End and later across the northeastern portion of Western Australia, and after emerging into the Indian Ocean it strengthened into a tropical storm. Aided by favourable environmental conditions, Glenda rapidly intensified to reach Category 5 status on the Australian cyclone scale, and with a peak intensity of 910 mbar it was among the strongest cyclones on record within the Australia region. On 30 March, it moved ashore near Onslow as a Category 3 cyclone, and the next day it degenerated into a remnant tropical low over land.

The precursor disturbance produced heavy rainfall in the Kimberley region of Western Australia, causing record flooding and some road damage. Minor damage was reported at the final landfall of Glenda. Due to the sparse population and preparations made, the cyclone was not responsible for any deaths or injuries. In all, damages from the storm amounted to A$1.2 million ($965,000 USD). However, its name was later retired from the list of tropical cyclone names.

=== Tropical Low ===
- Tropical low (Australian scale)
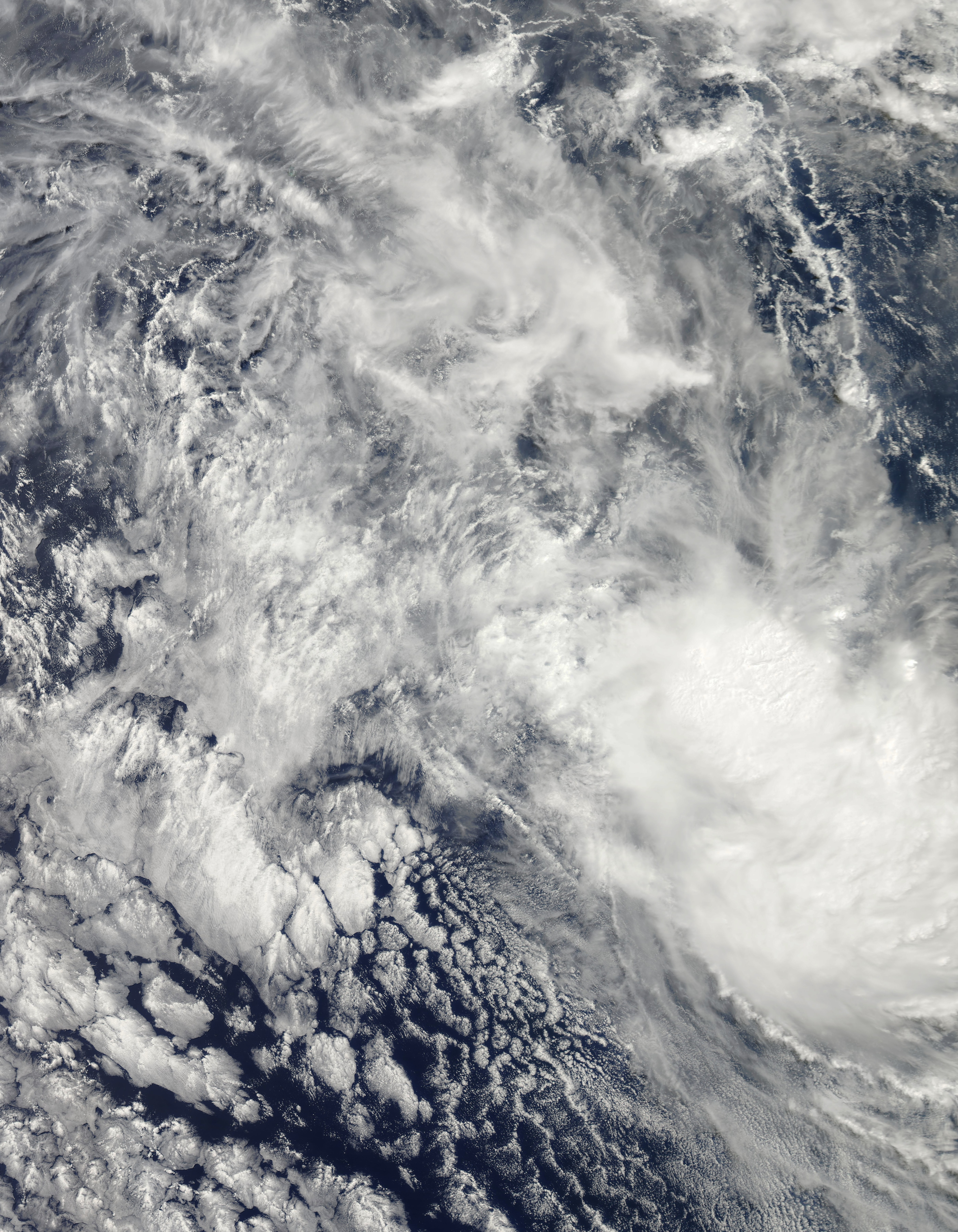
- Duration: 26 March – 29 March
- Peak intensity: 55 km/h (35 mph) (10-min); 994 hPa (mbar)

Cocos Islands faced their first cyclone threat this cyclone season on 25 March when a tropical low developed to its east-northeast. The low passed well to their east and did not develop further. The maximum sustained winds near the low were 30 knots and the minimum pressure was 994 hPa.

=== Tropical Cyclone Hubert ===
- Category 2 tropical cyclone (Australian scale)
- Tropical storm (SSHWS)
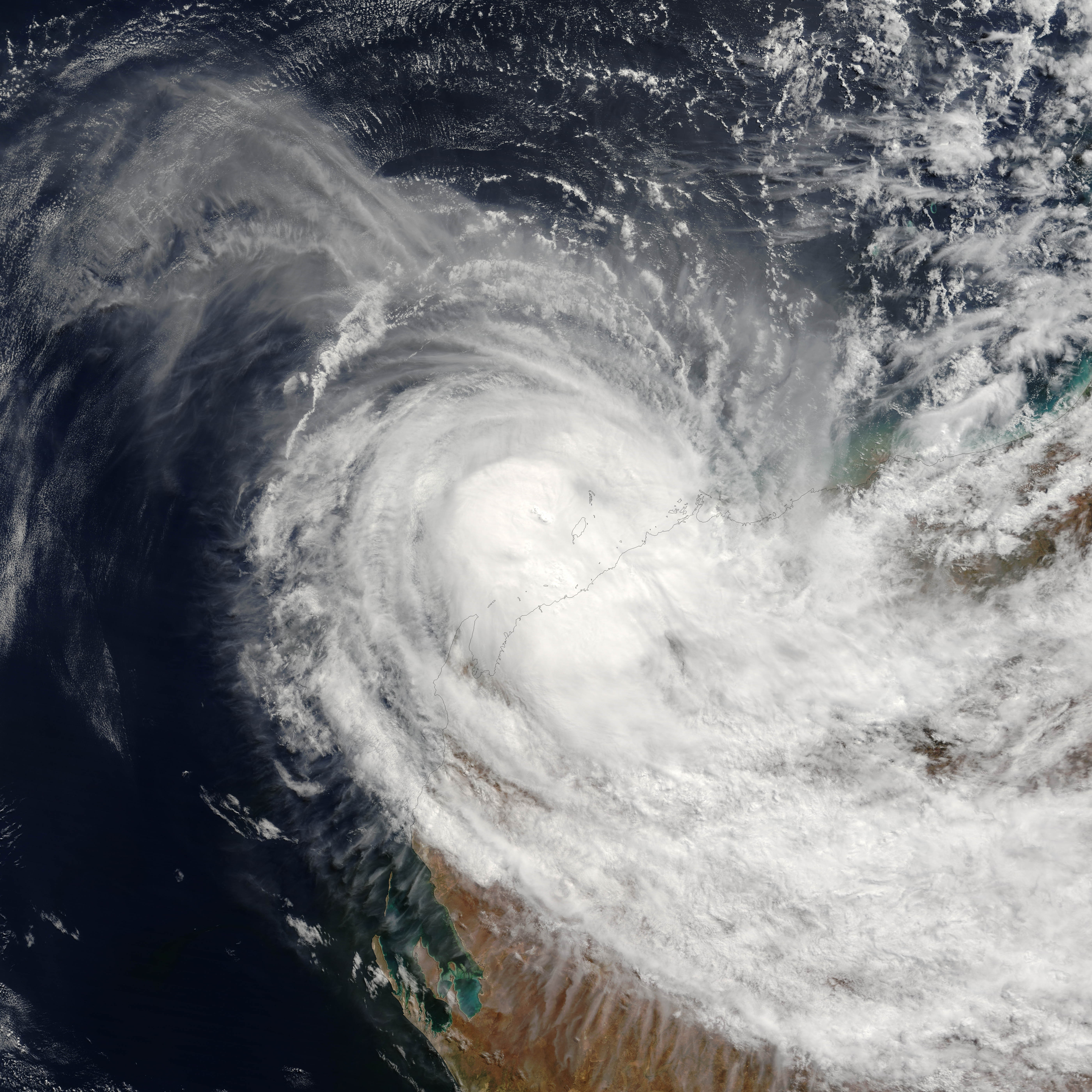
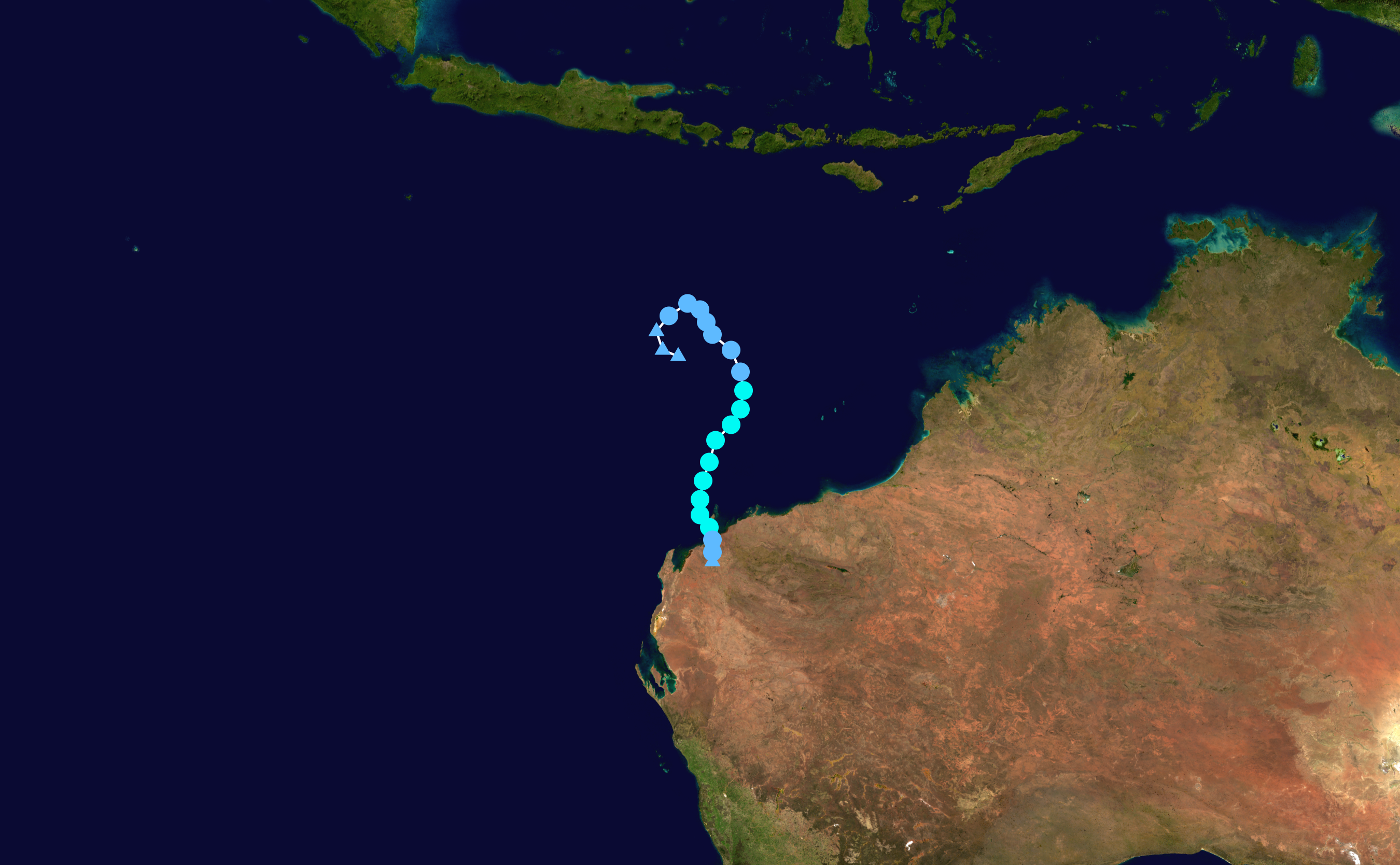
- Duration: 5 April – 7 April
- Peak intensity: 95 km/h (60 mph) (10-min); 980 hPa (mbar)

TCWC Perth issued a gale warning for a Tropical Low off Northwest Australia on 4 April. The low moved erratically at first, and then towards southwest. It strengthened into Tropical Cyclone Hubert (Australian Category 1) on 5 April and to Australian Category 2 on 6 April. Prior to landfall, Hubert weakened rapidly in an unfavourable atmospheric environment, and the surface circulation was poorly defined. Eventually, Hubert was downgraded to a tropical low with maximum sustained winds to 33 knots as it crossed the coast during the night of 7 April (based on AWST).

=== Tropical Low 21U (Elia) ===
- Tropical low (Australian scale)
- Tropical storm (SSHWS)
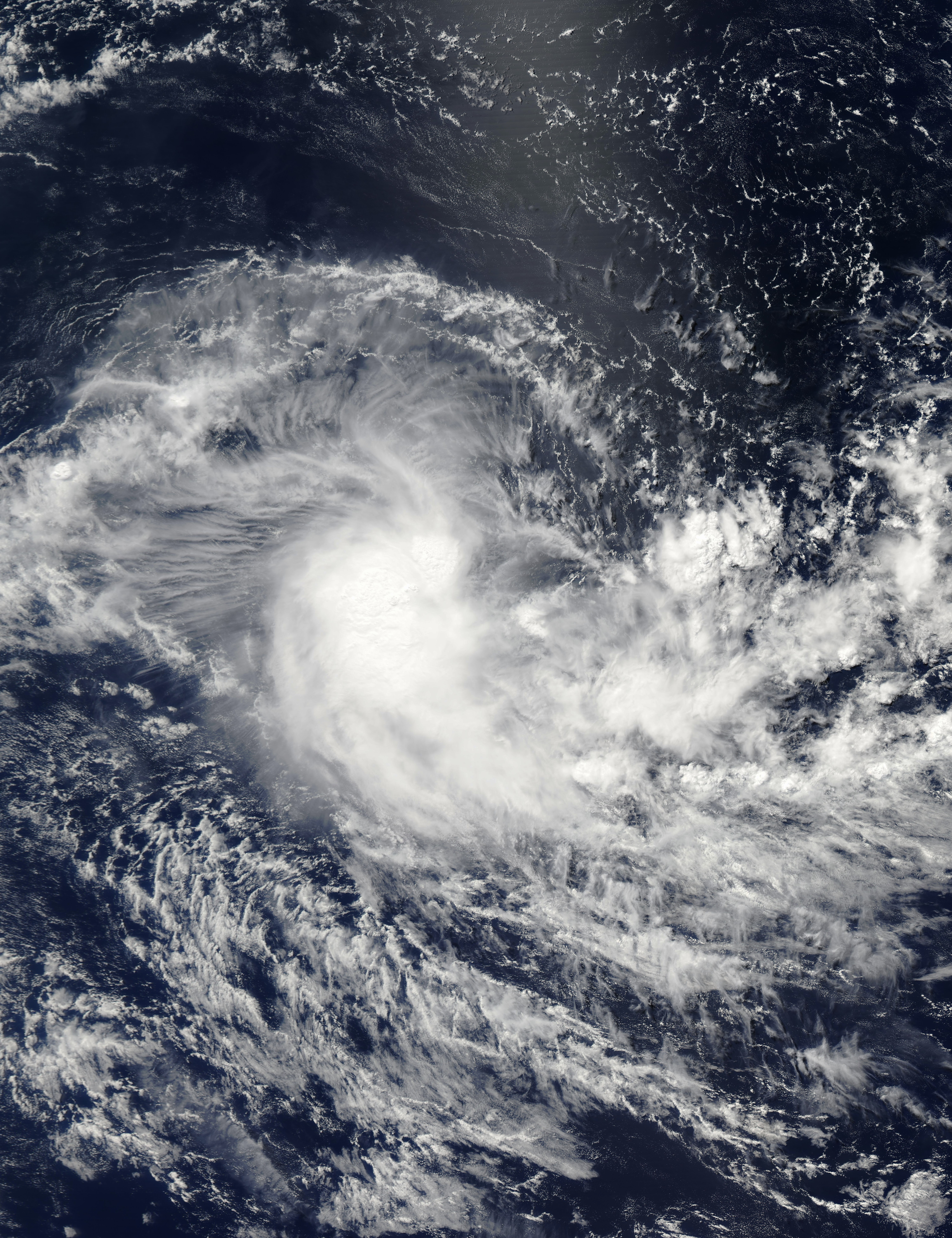
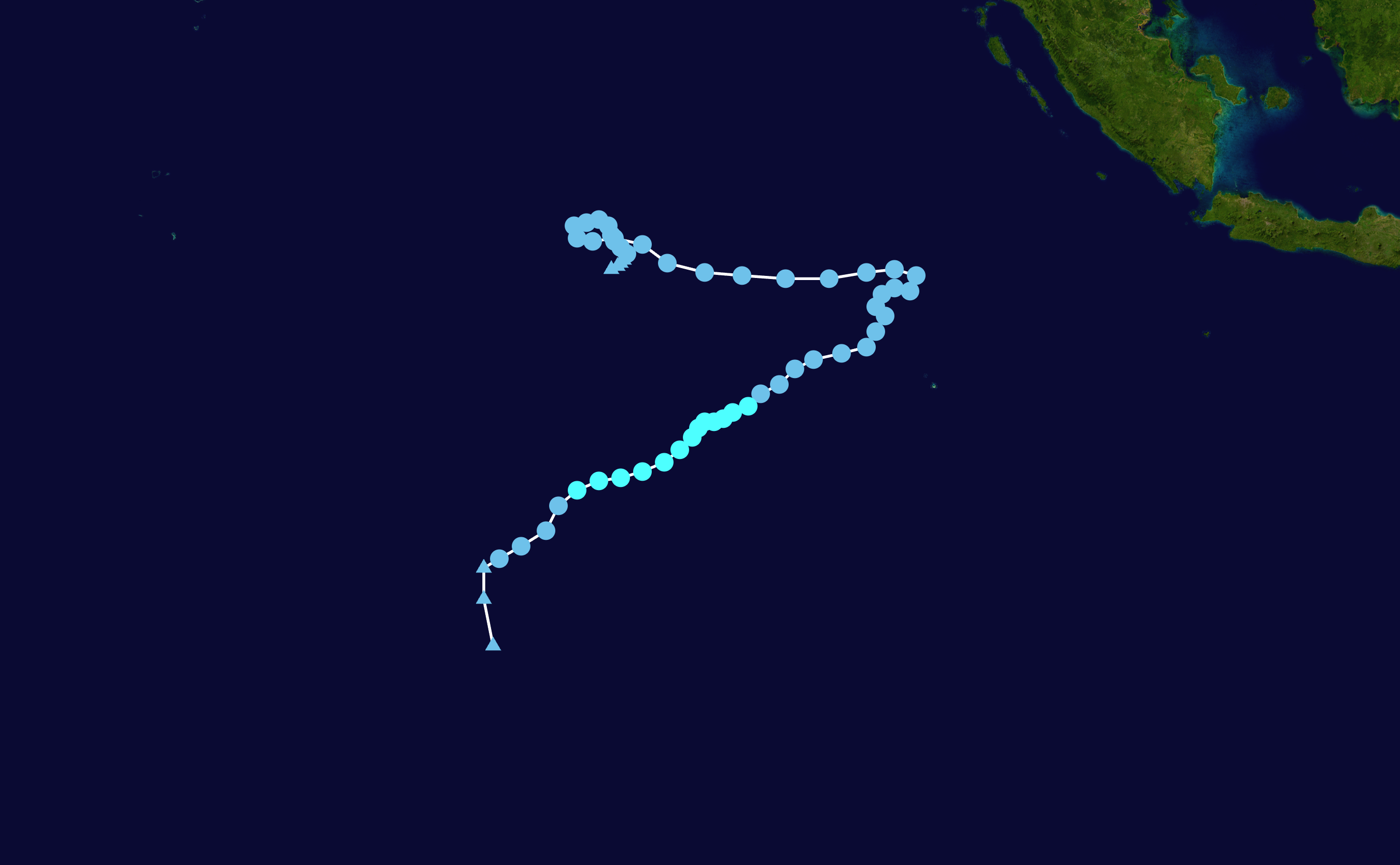
- Duration: 10 April – 13 April (exited basin)
- Peak intensity: 55 km/h (35 mph) (10-min);

=== Severe Tropical Cyclone Monica ===
- Category 5 severe tropical cyclone (Australian scale)
- Category 5 tropical cyclone (SSHWS)
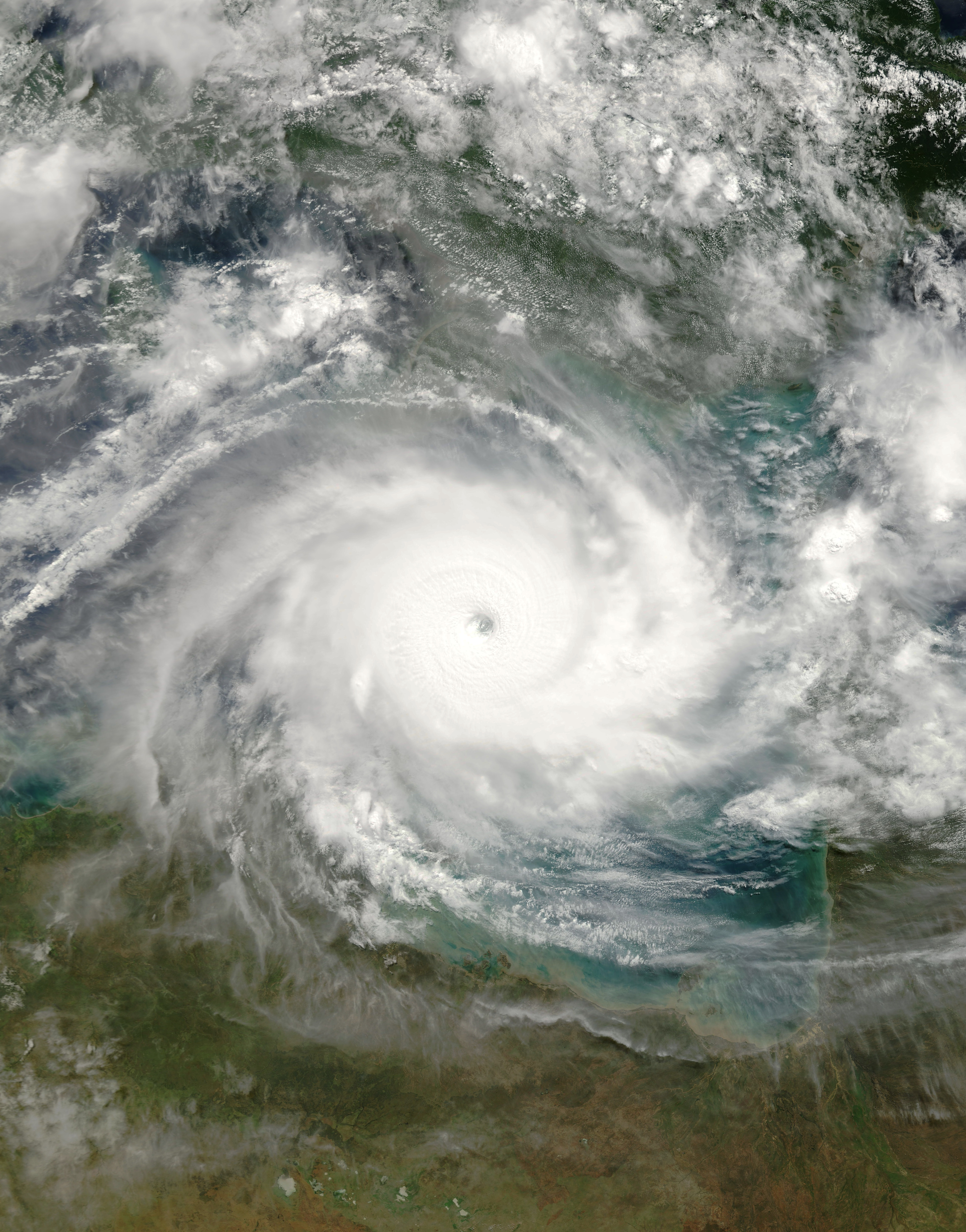
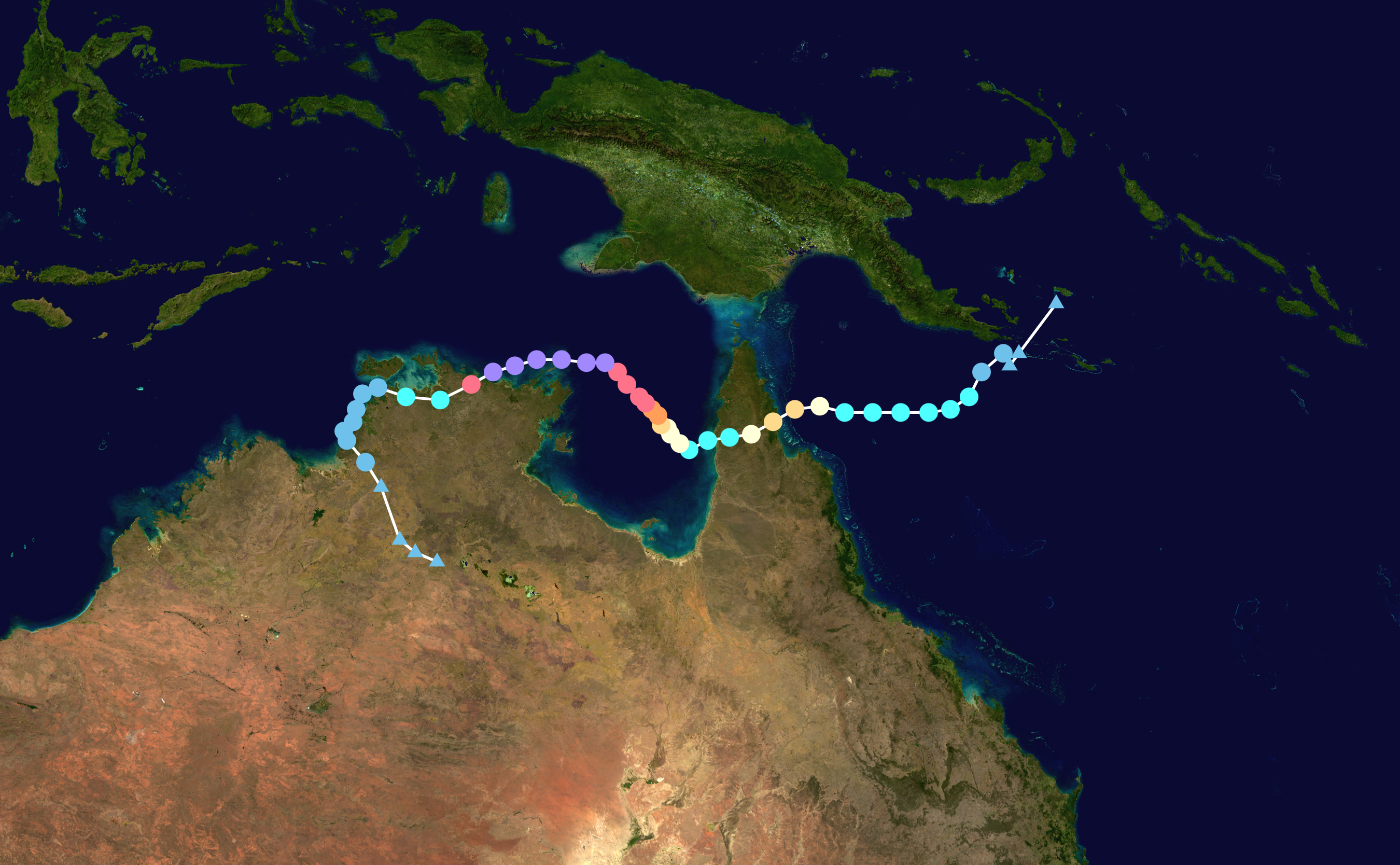
- Duration: 16 April – 26 April
- Peak intensity: 250 km/h (155 mph) (10-min); 916 hPa (mbar)

The final and second most intense storm of the season, Monica originated from an area of low pressure off the coast of Papua New Guinea on 16 April. The storm quickly developed into a Category 1 cyclone the next day, at which time it was given the name Monica. Traveling towards the west, the storm intensified into a severe tropical cyclone before making landfall in Far North Queensland, near the Lockhart River, on 19 April. After moving over land, convection associated with the storm quickly became disorganized.

On 20 April, moved over the Gulf of Carpentaria and began to re-intensify. Over the following few days, deep convection formed around a 37 km (23 mi) wide eye. Early on 22 April, the Bureau of Meteorology assessed Monica to have attained Category 5 status, on the Australian cyclone intensity scale. The JTWC also upgraded Monica to a Category 5 equivalent cyclone, on the Saffir–Simpson Hurricane Scale. The storm attained its peak intensity the following day with winds of 250 km/h (155 km/h 10-minute sustained) and a barometric pressure of 916 hPa (mbar). At the same time, the JTWC assessed the storm to have attained winds of 285 km/h (177 mph) 1-minute sustained), ranking it as one of the strongest storms ever recorded in the Southern Hemisphere. On 24 April, Monica made landfall about 35 km (22 mi) west of Maningrida, at the same intensity. Rapid weakening took place as the storm moved over land. Less than 24 hours after landfall, the storm had weakened to a tropical low. The remnants of the former-Category 5 cyclone persisted until 28 April over northern Australia.

In contrast to the extreme intensity of the cyclone, relatively little structural damage resulted from it. No injuries were reported throughout the storm's existence and losses were estimated to be A$1.6 million (US$766,000). However, severe environmental losses took place. In the Northern Territory, about 7,000 km^{2} (2,700 sq mi) of trees were downed by Monica's high wind gusts. In response to the large loss of forested area, it was stated that it would take several hundred years for the area to re-flourish.

== Storm names ==
=== Lists ===
TCWC Perth

- Bertie
- Clare
- Daryl
- Emma
- Floyd
- Glenda
- Hubert

TCWC Brisbane

- Jim
- Kate
- Larry
- Monica

== Season effects ==
Name	Dates	Peak intensity			Areas affected	Damage (USD)	Deaths	Ref(s).
Name	Dates	Category	Wind speed	Pressure	Areas affected	Damage (USD)	Deaths	Ref(s).
Low	5 – 8 November	Tropical low	35 km/h (25 mph)	995 hPa (29.38 inHg)	None	None	None	
Bertie-Alvin	19 – 24 November	Category 4 severe tropical cyclone	185 km/h (115 mph)	928 hPa (27.40 inHg)	None	None	None	
Low	21 – 23 December	Tropical low	35 km/h (25 mph)	998 hPa (29.47 inHg)	None	None	None	
Clare	January 6 – 10	Category 3 severe tropical cyclone	140 km/h (85 mph)	960 hPa (28.35 inHg)	Western Australia			
Daryl	17 - 23 January 2006	Category 2 tropical cyclone	100 km/h (65 mph)	976 hPa (28.82 inHg)	Western Australia	None	None	
Low	24 January – 1 February	Tropical low	35 km/h (25 mph)	989 hPa (29.21 inHg)	None	None	None	
Jim	27 – 30 January	Category 3 severe tropical cyclone	120 km/h (75 mph)	970 hPa (28.64 inHg)	None	None	None	
Kate	22 – 23 February	Category 2 tropical cyclone	95 km/h (60 mph)	985 hPa (29.09 inHg)	Torres Strait	Unknown	Unknown	
Emma	26 February – 1 March	Category 1 tropical cyclone	75 km/h (45 mph)	988 hPa (29.18 inHg)	Western Australia	Unknown	Unknown	
Low	28 February – 6 March	Tropical low	55 km/h (35 mph)	998 hPa (29.47 inHg)	None	None	None	
Larry	16 – 21 March	Category 5 severe tropical cyclone	205 km/h (125 mph)	949 hPa (28.02 inHg)	Queensland	$1.1 billion	1	
Floyd	18 – 27 March	Category 4 severe tropical cyclone	195 km/h (120 mph)	916 hPa (27.05 inHg)	Pilbara Coast		None	
Wati	20 March – 24 March	Category 3 severe tropical cyclone	155 km/h (100 mph)	955 hPa (28.20 inHg)	None	None	None	
Glenda	22 – 31 March	Category 5 severe tropical cyclone	205 km/h (125 mph)	910 hPa (26.87 inHg)	Northern Territory, Pilbara Coast		None	
Low	26 – 29 March	Tropical low	55 km/h (35 mph)	994 hPa (29.35 inHg)	None	None	None	
Hubert	2 – 8 April	Category 2 tropical cyclone	95 km/h (60 mph)	980 hPa (28.94 inHg)	Western Australia	None	None	
Monica	16 – 26 April	Category 5 severe tropical cyclone	250 km/h (155 mph)	916 hPa (27.05 inHg)	Queensland, Northern Territory		None	
Season aggregates
17 systems	5 November – 26 April		250 km/h (160 mph)	910 hPa (26.88 inHg)		$1.1 billion	1	

== See also ==
- List of Southern Hemisphere tropical cyclone seasons
- Tropical cyclones in 2005 and 2006
- Atlantic hurricane seasons: 2005, 2006
- Pacific hurricane seasons: 2005, 2006
- Pacific typhoon seasons: 2005, 2006
- North Indian Ocean cyclone seasons: 2005, 2006
