= Cheval tree =

The cheval tree is native to North Island, part of the Agaléga Islands, a territory of Mauritius. It is unique in its properties of minor adhesivity, which attracts insects: specifically, heel walkers (belonging to the Mantophasmatodea) or Formosozoros newi (belonging to the Zoraptera). The tree was named for the glue-like secretion of its bark and the use of horse-hooves for glue in former times—the French word (French is the colonizing language of Agalega) for "horse" is "cheval".

== The cheval and the Agalega day gecko ==
In a symbiotic relationship, the Agalega day gecko (Phelsuma borbonica agalegae) feeds off the insects trapped in the viscous, though thin, sap while depositing its vitamin-rich droppings at the base of the tree. Though this may seem to more resemble commensalism than not, the droppings do in fact provide a registrable gain for the cheval tree, though it is not nearly as great as the free and ample sustenance gained by the gecko. Scientists have yet to come up with a satisfactory explanation for this strange "selflessness" on the cheval's behalf, and have set up a research station in the Agalega town of Vingt-Cinq for further study.
