= Tropical cyclones in 2006 =

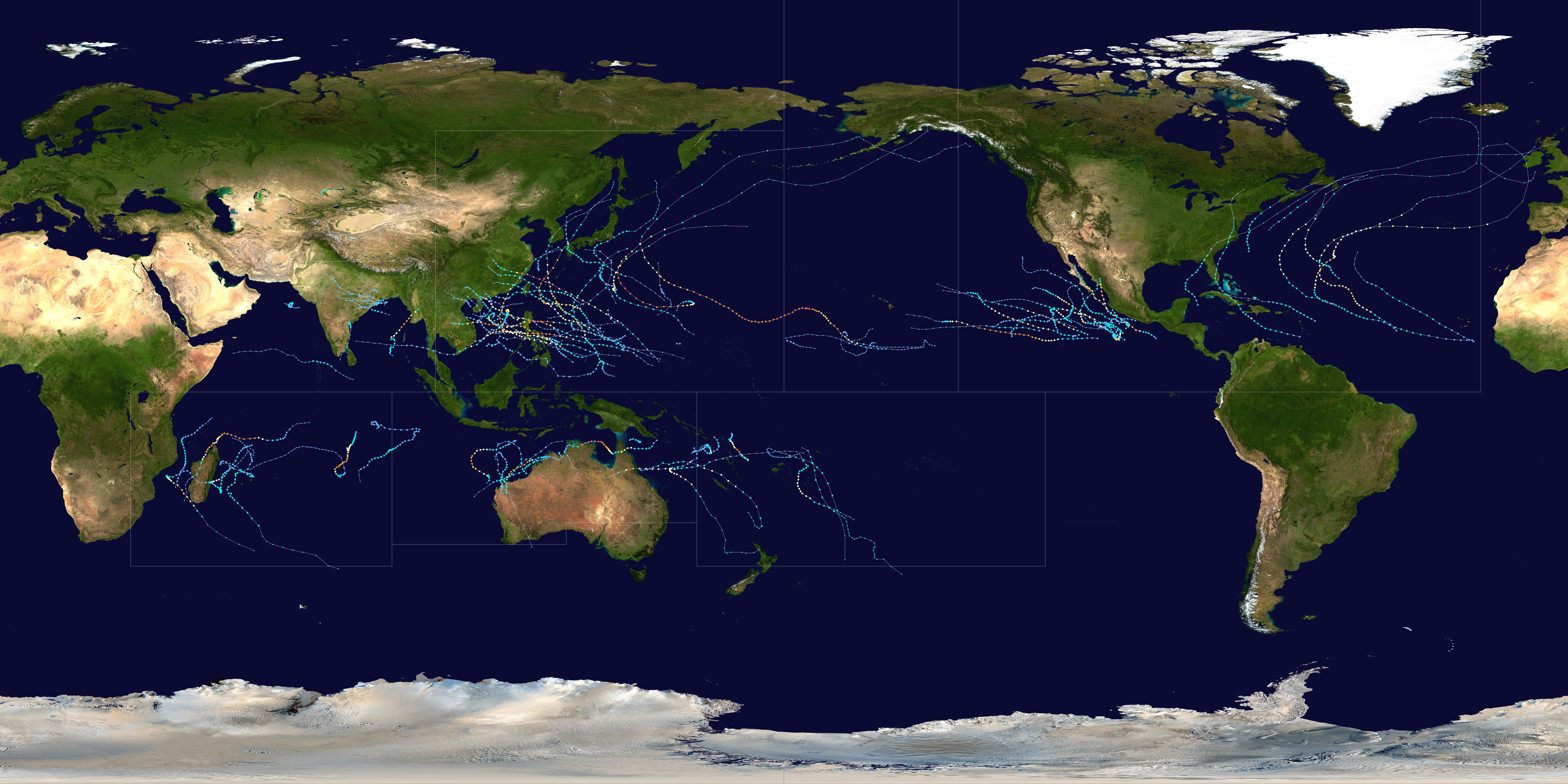
- Year summary map

Year boundaries
- First system: 07
- Formed: December 29, 2005
- Last system: Isobel
- Dissipated: January 5, 2007

Strongest system
- Name: Yagi & Glenda
- Lowest pressure: 910 mbar (hPa); 26.87 inHg

Longest lasting system
- Name: Ioke
- Duration: 18 days

Year statistics
- Total systems: 130, 6 unofficial
- Named systems: 81
- Total fatalities: 4,549 total
- Total damage: $16.36 billion (2006 USD)
Related articles
- 2006 Atlantic hurricane season
- 2006 Pacific hurricane season
- 2006 Pacific typhoon season
- 2006 North Indian Ocean cyclone season
- 2005–06 South-West Indian Ocean cyclone season
- 2006–07 South-West Indian Ocean cyclone season
- 2005–06 Australian region cyclone season
- 2006–07 Australian region cyclone season
- 2005–06 South Pacific cyclone season
- 2006–07 South Pacific cyclone season

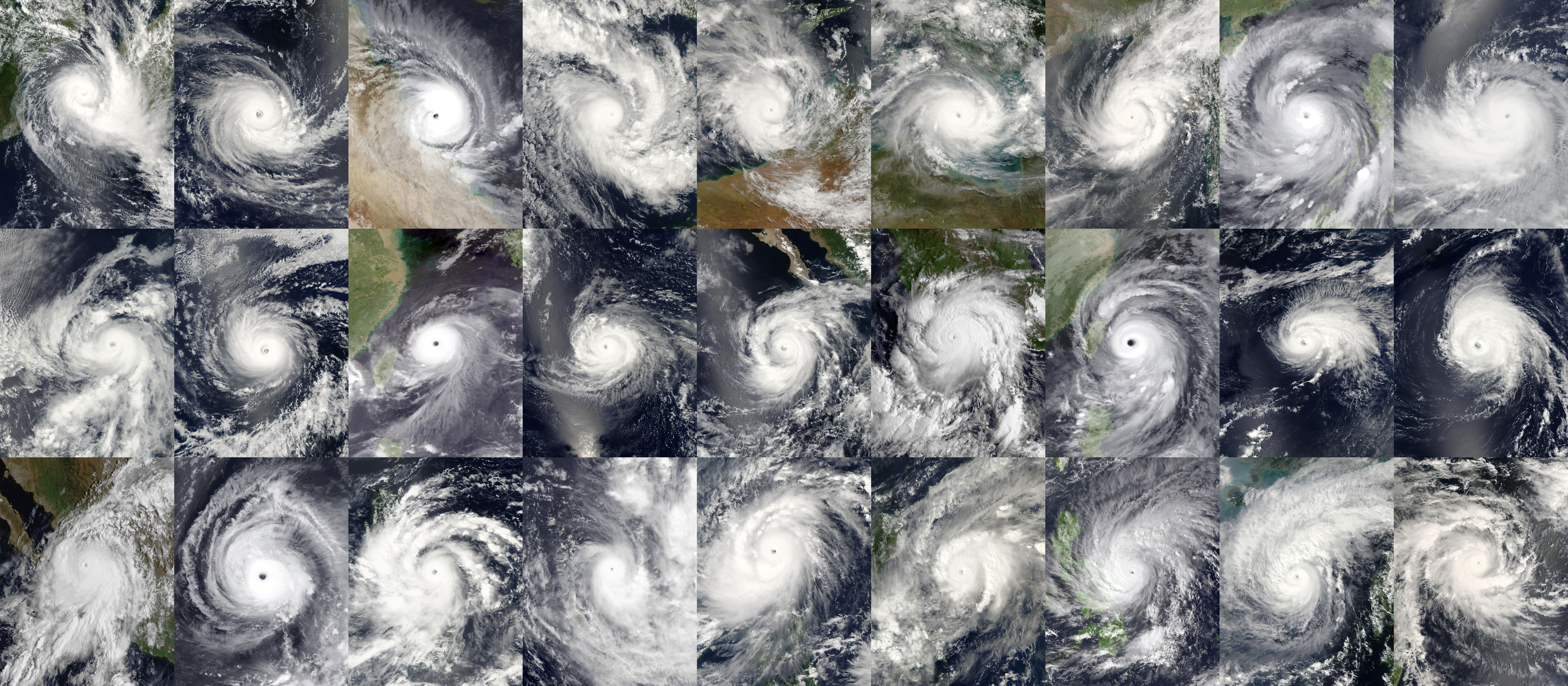
Satellite photos of the 27 tropical cyclones worldwide that reached Category 3 or higher on the Saffir–Simpson scale during 2006, from Boloetse in January to Bondo in December. Among them, Glenda (fifth image in the first row) and Yagi (second image in the third row) were the most intense, both with a minimum central pressure of 910 hPa.

Throughout 2006, 133 tropical cyclones formed in seven bodies of water known as tropical cyclone basins. Of these, 80 have been named, including two tropical cyclones in the South Atlantic Ocean, and a tropical cyclone in the Mediterranean Sea, by various weather agencies when they attained maximum sustained winds of 65 km/h (40 mph). The strongest storms of the year were Typhoon Yagi in the Western Pacific, and Cyclone Glenda of the Australian region. The deadliest and costliest storms of the year were a series of five typhoons that struck the Philippines and China; Chanchu, Bilis, Saomai, Xangsane, and Durian, with most of the damage being caused by Durian of November. During the year, 27 Category 3 tropical cyclones formed, including five Category 5 tropical cyclones in the year. The accumulated cyclone energy (ACE) index for 2006 (seven basins combined), as calculated by Colorado State University was 761 units.

Tropical cyclones are primarily monitored by a group of ten warning centres, which have been designated as a Regional Specialized Meteorological Center (RSMC) or a Tropical Cyclone Warning Center (TCWC) by the World Meteorological Organization. These are the United States National Hurricane Center (NHC) and Central Pacific Hurricane Center, the Japan Meteorological Agency (JMA), the India Meteorological Department (IMD), Météo-France, Indonesia's Badan Meteorologi, Klimatologi, dan Geofisika, the Australian Bureau of Meteorology (BOM), Papua New Guinea's National Weather Service, the Fiji Meteorological Service (FMS) as well as New Zealand's MetService. Other notable warning centres include the Philippine Atmospheric, Geophysical and Astronomical Services Administration (PAGASA), the United States Joint Typhoon Warning Center (JTWC), and the Brazilian Navy Hydrographic Center.

== Global atmospheric and hydrological conditions ==
Despite the US National Oceanographic and Atmospheric Administration (NOAA) outlook issued on 22 May 2006 indicating an 80% chance of an above-normal hurricane season, tropical cyclone activity in 2006 was unexpectedly very weak. One factor was the buildup of a strong El Niño event in the eastern Pacific. Over the second quarter of 2006, the majority of atmospheric and oceanic indicators reflected neutral conditions but, in August, conditions in the central and western equatorial Pacific started resembling typical early stages of an El Niño event.

== Summary ==
In the Northern Hemisphere, 10 tropical cyclones have developed or formed in the North Atlantic Ocean basin, 25 in the Eastern and Central Pacific (including one unofficial subtropical cyclone), 40 in the Western Pacific (including three unofficial tropical cyclones), and 12 in the North Indian (including one unofficial deep depression), totaling to 88 official and 6 unofficial tropical cyclones in the Northern Hemisphere, including one official and one unofficial tropical cyclones in the Mediterranean Sea.

In the Southern Hemisphere, 11 tropical cyclones have developed or formed in the South-West Indian Ocean basin, 19 in the South-Central Pacific/Fiji Region, 14 in the South-East Indian/Southwestern Pacific/Australian Region, and including 2 in the South Atlantic/Southeastern Pacific, thus totaling to 46 tropical cyclones in the Southern Hemisphere.

In the whole world combined, 134 tropical cyclones have developed throughout the whole world, including 6 unofficial systems, equaling 140 total tropical cyclones.

== Systems ==
=== January ===
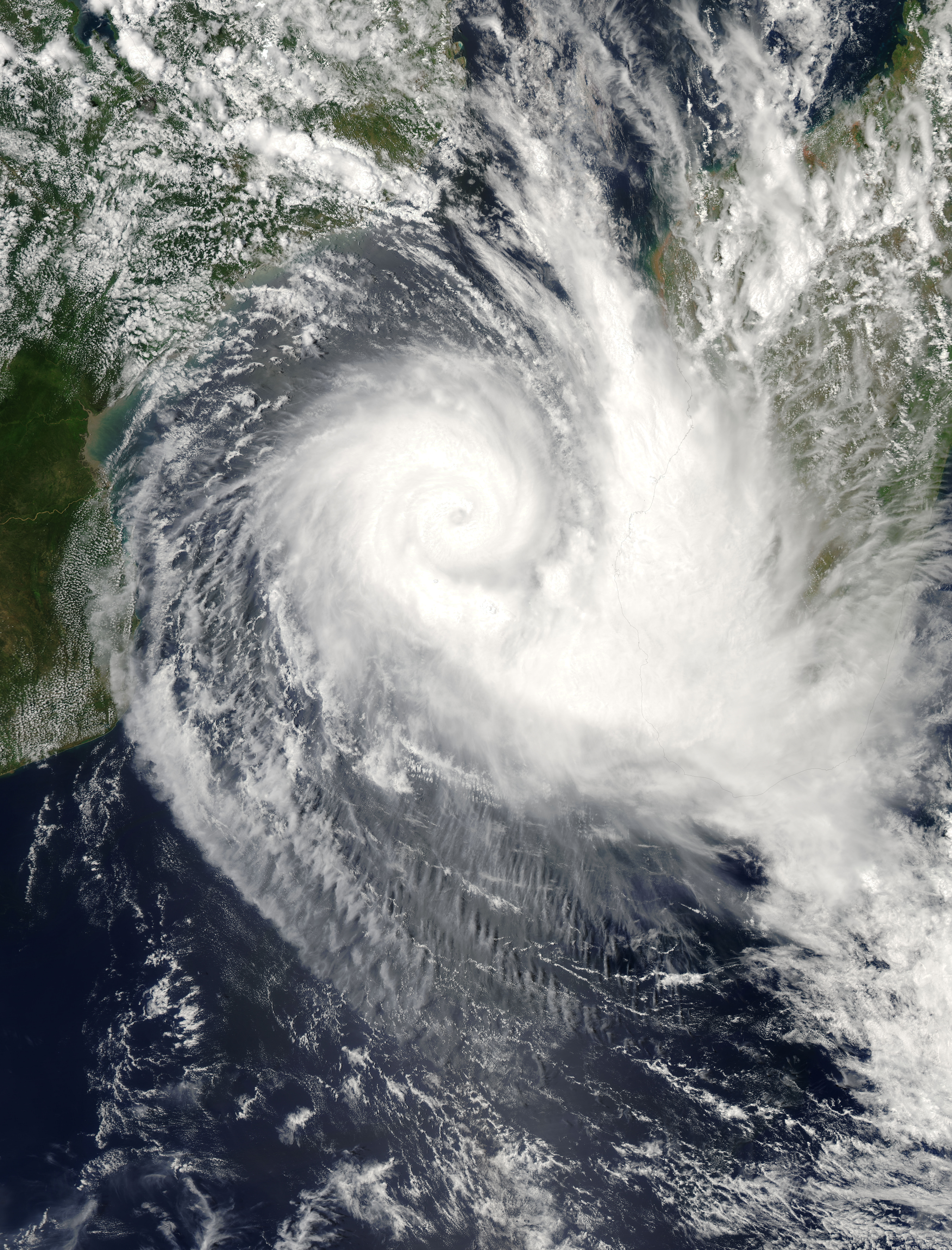
Cyclone Boloetse

During January 2006, a total of 12 tropical cyclones have developed in tropical cyclone basins. Of those, 7 were named, with 6 of those named systems having tropical storm-equivalent force winds, in ten or three-minute sustained wind speeds. Tropical Storm Zeta from the extremely hyperactive 2005 Atlantic hurricane season became only the second of two tropical storms in the Atlantic to have spanned two different calendar years, with the other being Hurricane Alice of 1954–55. Speaking, Cyclones Tam and Clare were the only tropical cyclones in January 2006 to have known damage totals, even though Boloetse was the most severe and deadliest in the month. Boloetse was also the strongest and most intense tropical cyclone of the month, peaking with 10-minute sustained winds of 100 mph and pressure dropping to 950 hPa/mbar.

Tropical cyclones formed in January 2006
| Storm name | Dates active | Max wind km/h (mph) | Pressure (hPa) | Areas affected | Damage (USD) | Deaths | Refs |
|---|---|---|---|---|---|---|---|
| Tam | January 6–14 | 85 (50) | 987 | American Samoa, Rotuma Niue, Tonga, Futuna | $26,000 | None | |
| Clare | January 6–10 | 140 (85) | 960 | Western Australia | $2.3 million | None | |
| 05F | January 10–13 | 55 (35) | 996 | None | None | None | |
| ARB 01 | January 13–14 | 55 (35) | 1004 | Kerala, Lakshadweep | None | None | |
| Urmil | January 13–15 | 110 (70) | 975 | Tafahi, Niuatoputapu, Vavaʻu, Ha'apai | Minimal | None | |
| 07F | January 15–16 | 30 (15) | Unspecified | Fiji | None | None | |
| Daryl | January 18–22 | 100 (65) | 976 | Coast of Western Australia | None | None | |
| Agaton | January 20–27 | 55 (35) | 1000 | Philippines | None | None | |
| Boloetse | January 20 – February 5 | 155 (100) | 950 | Madagascar, coast of Mozambique | Catastrophic | 6 | |
| 07U | January 24 – February 1 | 55 (35) | 989 | Northern Territory (Australia), portions of Western Australia | Moderate | None | |
| Jim | January 25 – February 3 | 150 (90) | 955 | New Caledonia, southern Vanuatu | Minor | None | |
| 09F | January 30 – February 5 | Unspecified | 994 | None | None | None | |

=== February ===
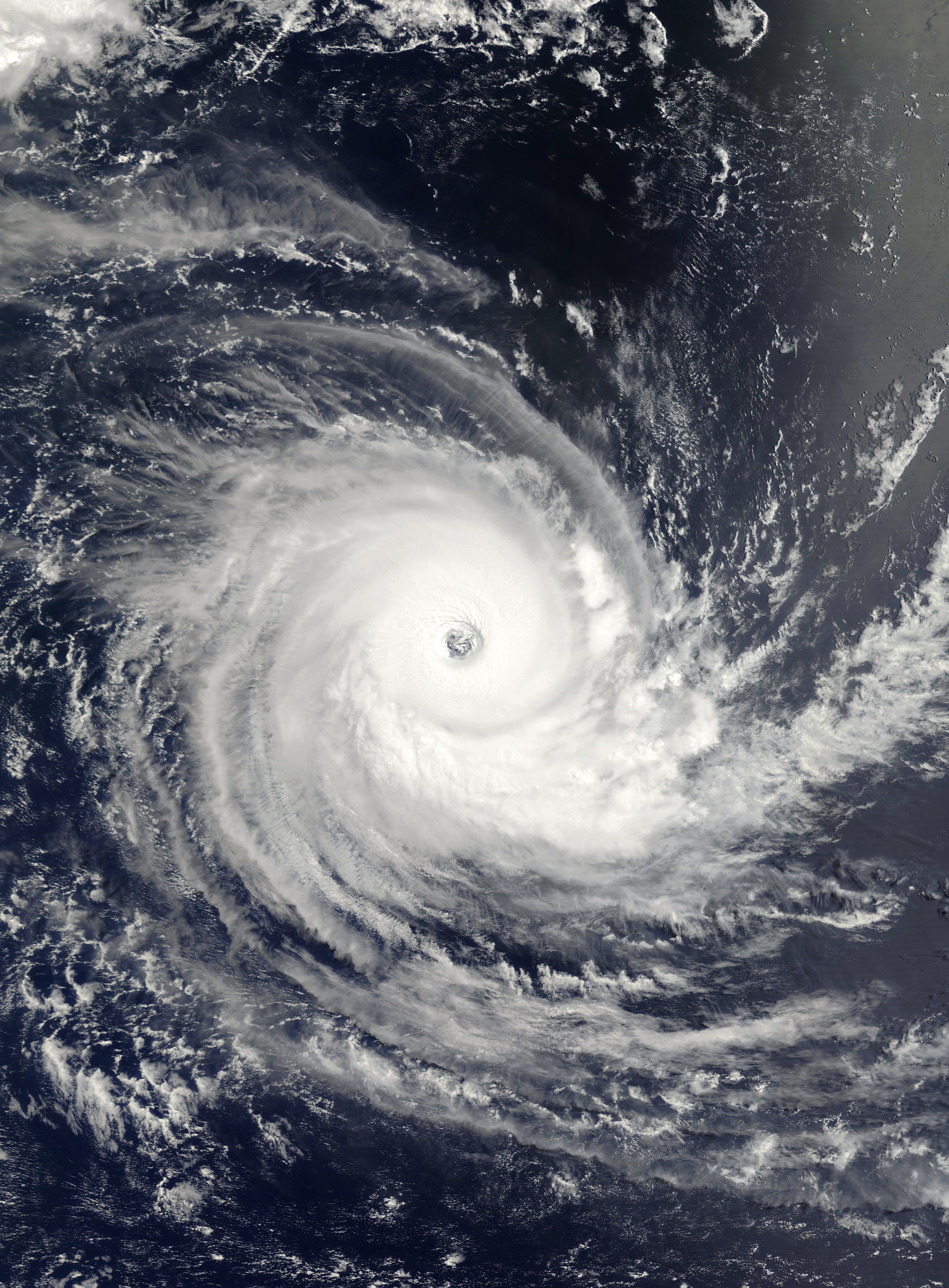
Cyclone Carina

Tropical cyclones formed in February 2006
| Storm name | Dates active | Max wind km/h (mph) | Pressure (hPa) | Areas affected | Damage (USD) | Deaths | Refs |
|---|---|---|---|---|---|---|---|
| 10F | February 2–4 | 55 (35) | 998 | Niue, Tongatapu | None | None | |
| 11F | February 8–10 | 35 (25) | Unspecified | None | None | None | |
| Vaianu | February 9–22 | 130 (80) | 965 | Tonga | None | None | |
| 09 | February 18–23 | 95 (60) | 992 | Mauritius, Réunion, Madagascar | Minimal | None | |
| 13F | February 19–26 | 35 (25) | Unspecified | None | None | None | |
| Kate | February 22–24 | 95 (60) | 985 | Papua New Guinea and Queensland, Australia | None | None | |
| 01Q | February 22–23 | 105 (65) | Unspecified | None | None | None | |
| Carina | February 22 – March 11 | 205 (125) | 915 | None | None | None | |
| Emma | February 25 – March 1 | 75 (45) | 988 | Western Australia | $706,000 | None | |
| TL | February 28 – March 6 | 55 (35) | 998 | Papua New Guinea, Indonesia | Unknown | None | |

=== March ===
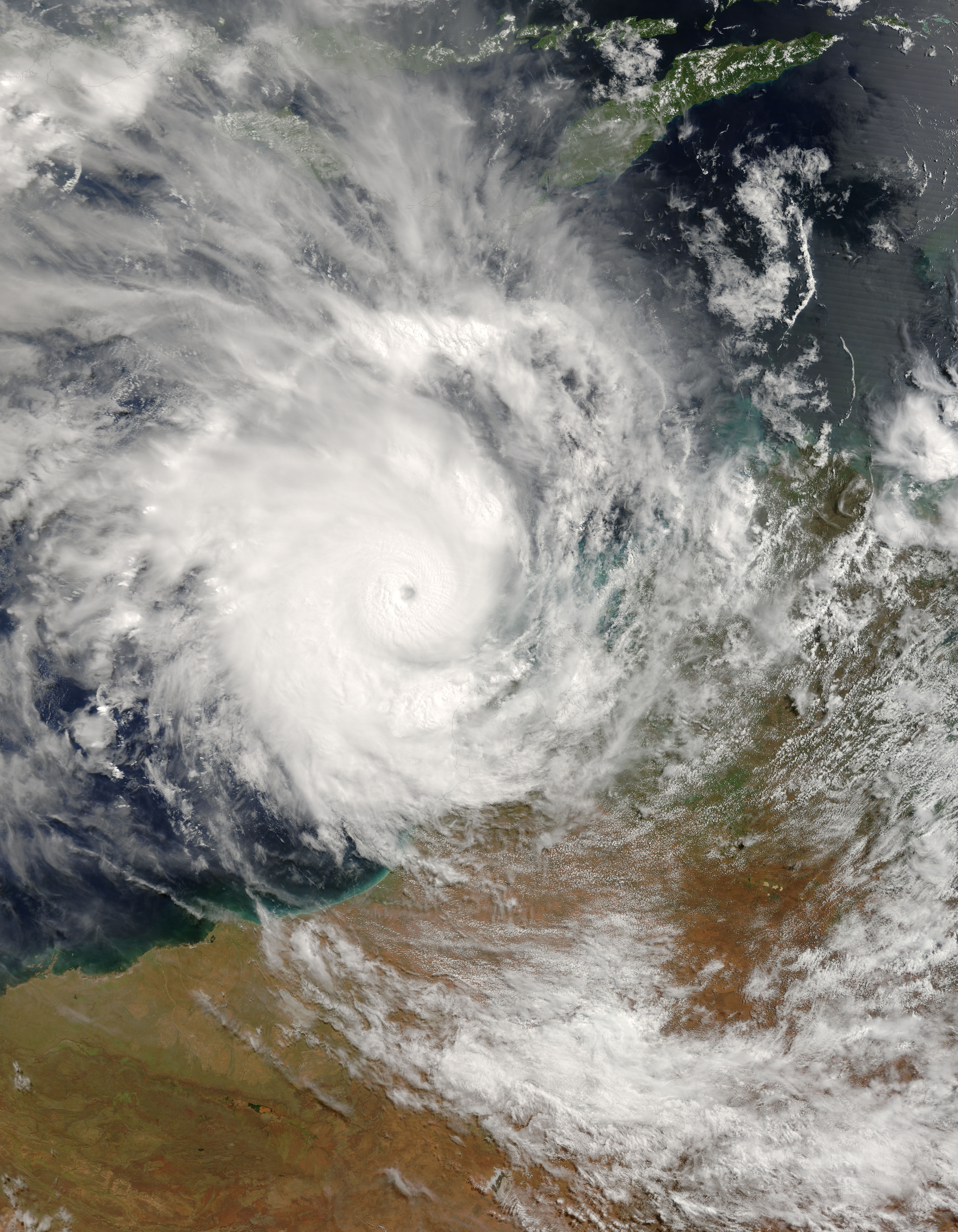
Cyclone Glenda

Tropical cyclones formed in March 2006
| Storm name | Dates active | Max wind km/h (mph) | Pressure (hPa) | Areas affected | Damage (USD) | Deaths | Refs |
|---|---|---|---|---|---|---|---|
| Diwa | March 2–8 | 110 (70) | 980 | Réunion, St. Brandon, Mauritius | Major | 10 | |
| 01W (Basyang) | March 3–7 | 55 (35) | 1004 | Caroline Islands | None | None | |
| 12 | March 4 | Unspecified | Unspecified | None | None | None | |
| TD | March 7–10 | Unspecified | 1004 | Philippines | None | None | |
| TD | March 11–12 | Unspecified | 1006 | Philippines, Vietnam | None | None | |
| 02Q | March 11–17 | Unspecified | Unspecified | None | None | None | |
| 14F | March 13–16 | Unspecified | Unspecified | None | None | None | |
| Wati | March 17–28 | 155 (100) | 950 | Vanuatu | Minor | None | |
| Larry | March 18–24 | 185 (115) | 940 | Queensland, Australia | $1.1 billion | 1 indirect | |
| Floyd | March 18–27 | 195 (120) | 916 | None | None | None | |
| Glenda | March 22–31 | 205 (125) | 910 | Australia | $965,000 | None | |
| TL | March 26–29 | 55 (35) | 994 | None | None | None | |

=== April ===
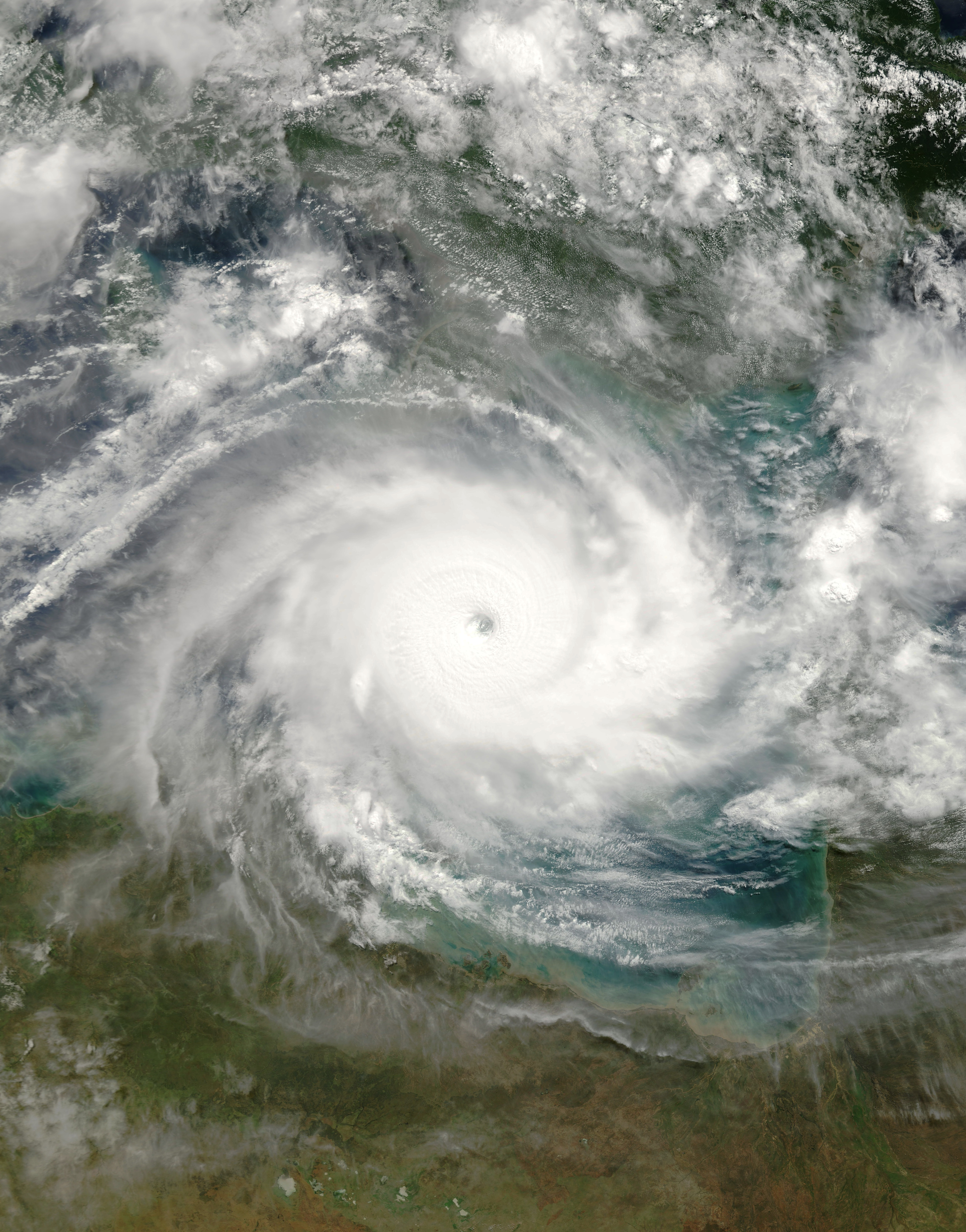
Cyclone Monica

April was relatively inactive in the year that 5 tropical cyclones formed throughout the month. 4 received names. Severe Tropical Cyclone Monica became the first Category 5-equivalent tropical cyclone in 2006, according to the Saffir–Simpson Hurricane Wind Scale (in 1-minute sustained winds). As being the strongest of the year 2006, it was the most intense of the month, peaking at 916 hPa/mbar. Extremely Severe Cyclonic Storm Mala was the strongest of the 2006 North Indian Ocean cyclone season, as well as the most serious. Moderate Tropical Storm/Tropical Cyclone Elia concluded the 2005–06 South-West Indian Ocean cyclone season when it dissipated on April 17. Monica was the last tropical cyclone in the Southern Hemisphere for the first half of 2006 (January–June).

Tropical cyclones formed in April 2006
| Storm name | Dates active | Max wind km/h (mph) | Pressure (hPa) | Areas affected | Damage (USD) | Deaths | Refs |
|---|---|---|---|---|---|---|---|
| Hubert | April 5–7 | 95 (60) | 980 | Western Australia | None | None | |
| Elia | April 6–17 | 75 (45) | 990 | None | None | None | |
| Monica | April 16–28 | 250 (155) | 916 | Papua New Guinea, Australia | $5.1 million | None | |
| 17F | April 20–21 | Unspecified | Unspecified | None | None | None | |
| Mala | April 25–29 | 185 (115) | 954 | Andaman Islands, Myanmar, Northern Thailand | $6.7 million | 37 | |

=== May ===
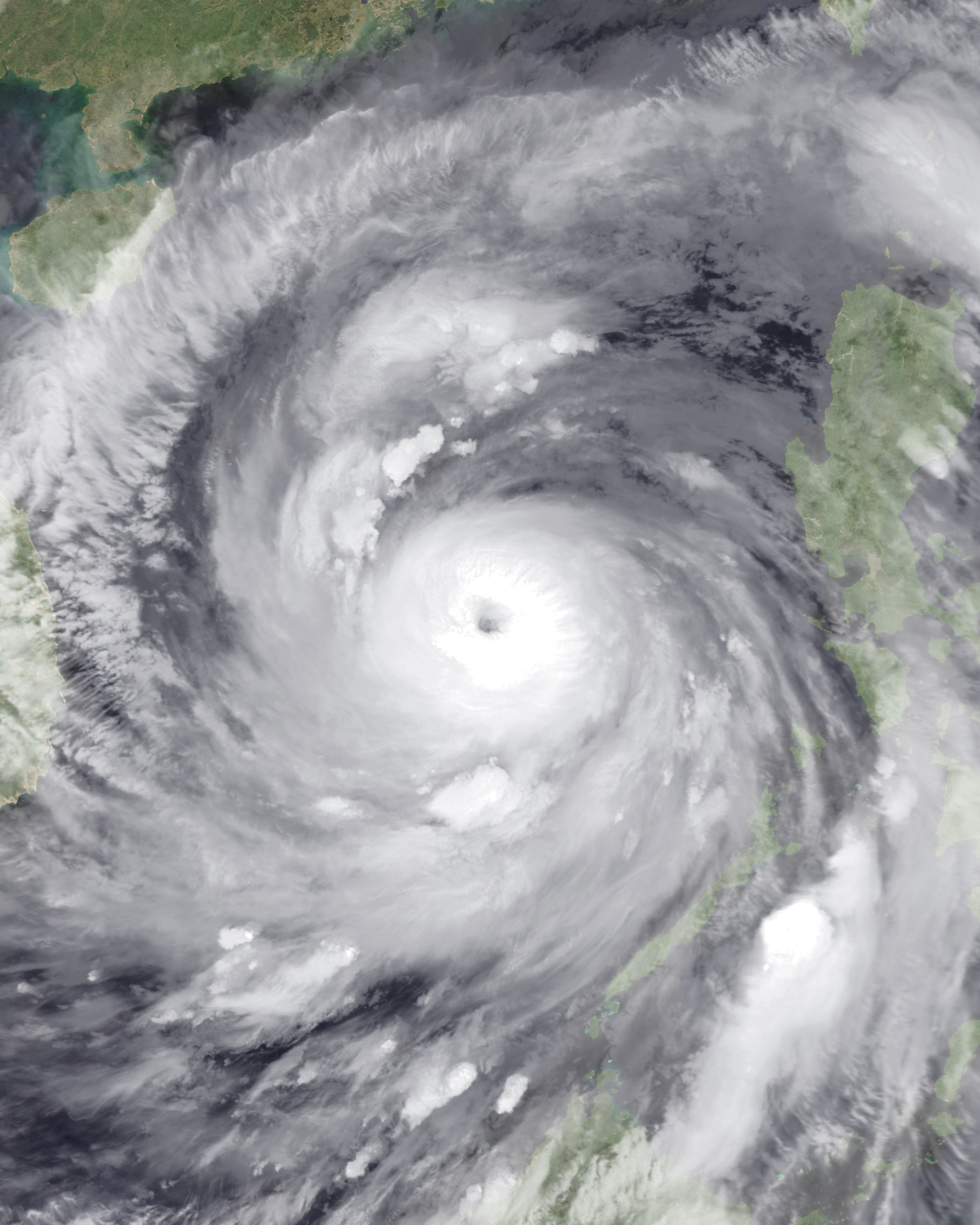
Typhoon Chanchu

May was super inactive with only two tropical cyclones forming. Both received names. Typhoon Chanchu (Philippine name 'Caloy') was the stronger tropical cyclone of May 2006. Chanchu was the first tropical storm and typhoon of the 2006 Pacific typhoon season, and it was a very deadly and somewhat costly tropical cyclone. Tropical Storm Aletta started the 2006 Pacific hurricane season what it formed as Tropical Depression One-E on May 27.

Tropical cyclones formed in May 2006
| Storm name | Dates active | Max wind km/h (mph) | Pressure (hPa) | Areas affected | Damage (USD) | Deaths | Refs |
|---|---|---|---|---|---|---|---|
| Chanchu (Caloy) | May 8–18 | 175 (110) | 930 | Caroline Islands, Philippines, China, Taiwan, Japan, Korea | $879 million | 309 | |
| Aletta | May 27–30 | 75 (45) | 1002 | None | Minimal | None | |

=== June ===
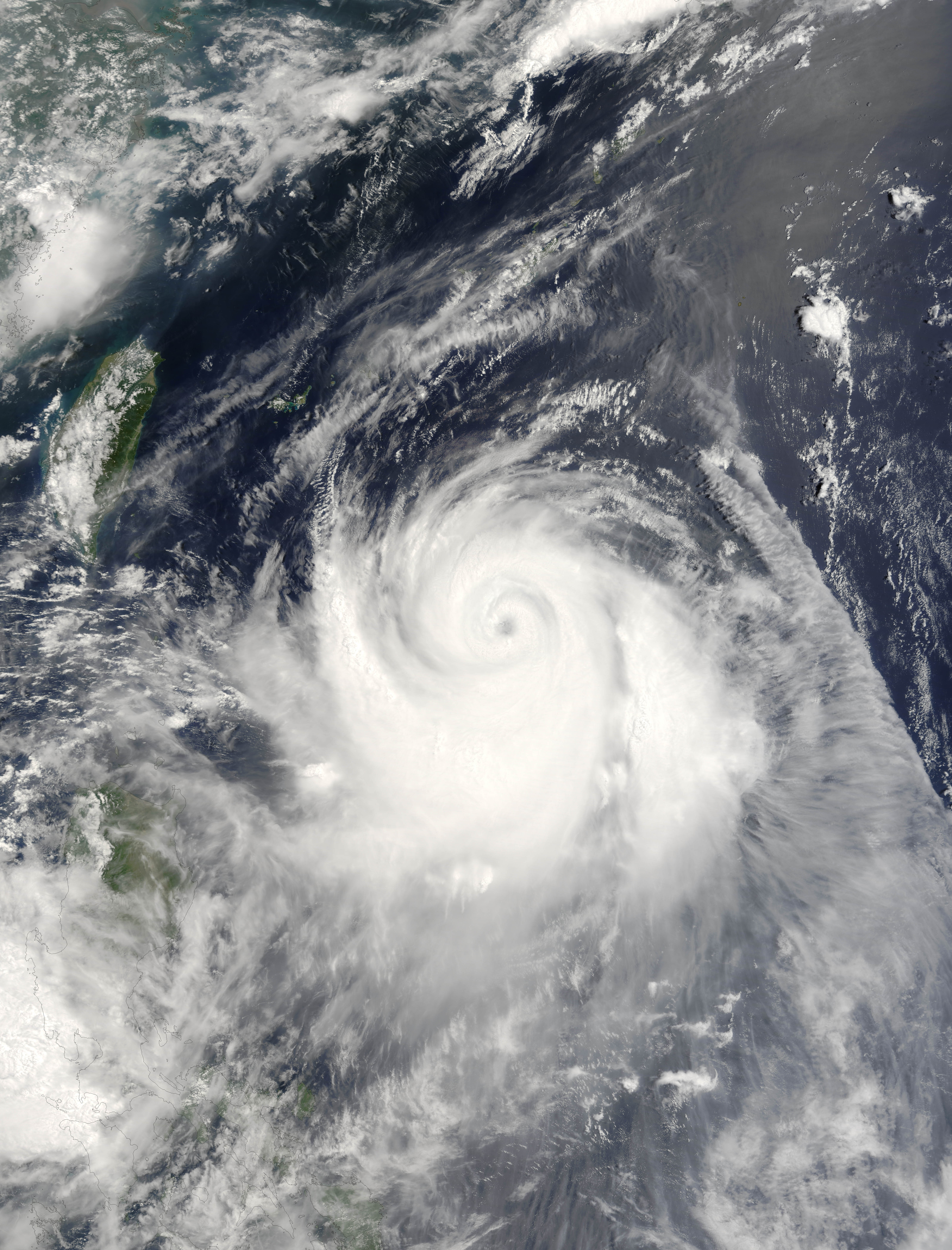
Typhoon Ewiniar

June was a very inactive month in the year when only four tropical cyclones formed within the northern hemisphere, three of them received names. Tropical Storm Alberto started the 2006 Atlantic hurricane season when it formed on June 10, preceding a below average season later in the year. When Tropical Depression Two-E dissipated on June 5, the 2006 Pacific hurricane season experienced a slightly long lull in activity, not seeing Hurricane Bud form until mid-July. Super Typhoon Ewiniar (Philippine name 'Ester') became the first super typhoon of the 2006 Pacific typhoon season, also causing heavy damage and 150+ fatalities.

Tropical cyclones formed in June 2006
| Storm name | Dates active | Max wind km/h (mph) | Pressure (hPa) | Areas affected | Damage (USD) | Deaths | Refs |
|---|---|---|---|---|---|---|---|
| Two-E | June 3–5 | 55 (35) | 1005 | Southwestern Mexico, Western Mexico | None | None | |
| Alberto | June 10–14 | 110 (70) | 995 | Southeast United States, Atlantic Canada, Florida | $420 thousand | 2 | |
| Jelawat (Domeng) | June 24–29 | 75 (40) | 996 | Caroline Islands, Philippines, China | Unknown | 7 | |
| Ewiniar (Ester) | June 29 – July 10 | 185 (115) | 930 | Caroline Islands, Ryukyu Islands, Korea | $1.4 billion | 181 | |

=== July ===
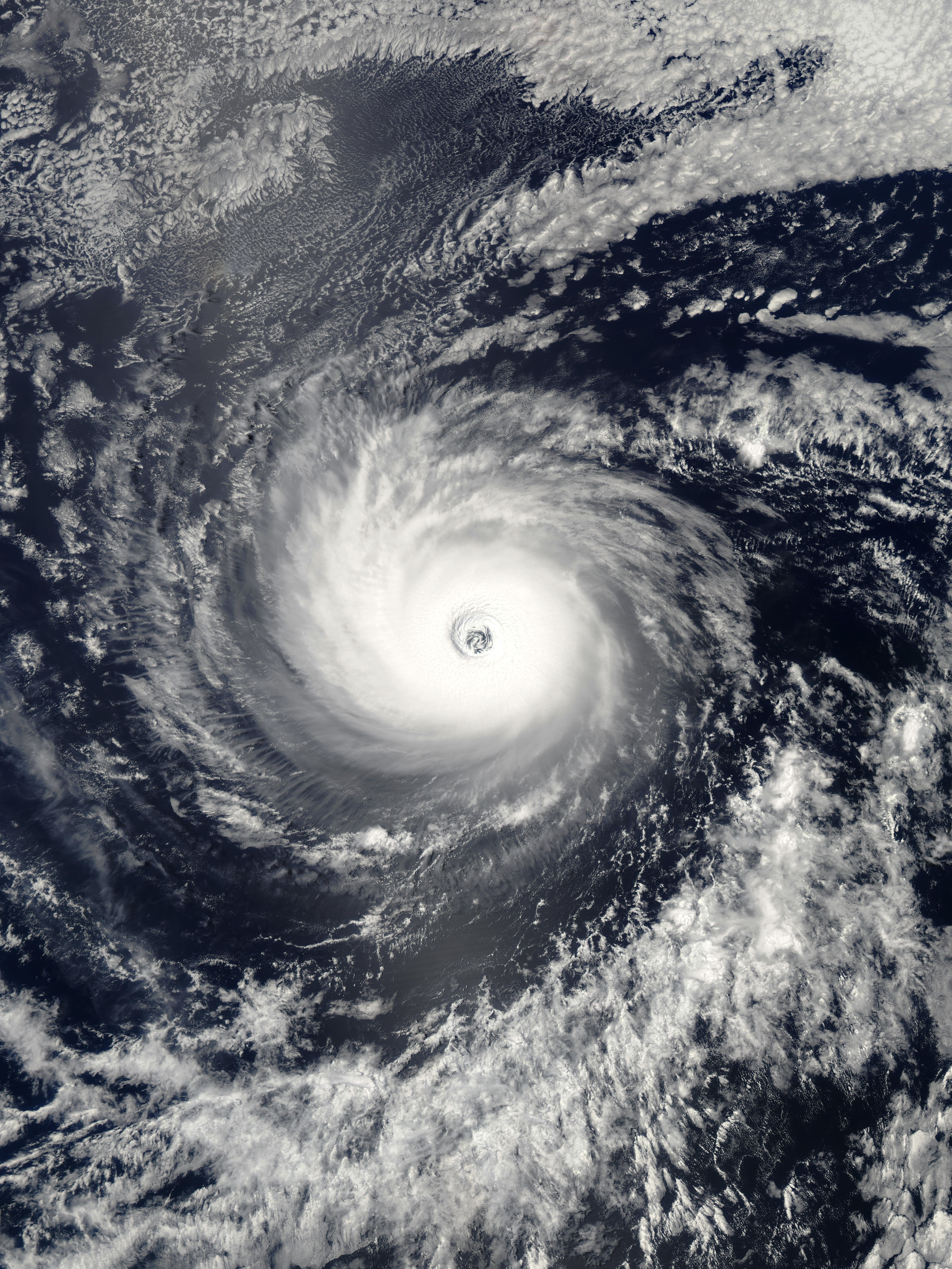
Hurricane Daniel

Tropical cyclones formed in July 2006
| Storm name | Dates active | Max wind km/h (mph) | Pressure (hPa) | Areas affected | Damage (USD) | Deaths | Refs |
|---|---|---|---|---|---|---|---|
| BOB 02 | July 2–5 | 55 (35) | 982 | East India | Unknown | 123 | |
| Bilis (Florita) | July 8–16 | 110 (70) | 970 | Caroline Islands, Taiwan, China | $4.4 billion | 859 | |
| Bud | July 11–16 | 205 (125) | 953 | Hawaii | None | None | |
| Carlotta | July 12–16 | 140 (85) | 981 | None | None | None | |
| Daniel | July 16–26 | 240 (150) | 933 | Hawaii | None | None | |
| Kaemi (Glenda) | July 17–27 | 150 (90) | 950 | Caroline Islands, Mariana Islands, Taiwan, China | $450 million | 32 | |
| Unnamed | July 17–18 | 85 (50) | 998 | East Coast of the United States, Atlantic Canada | None | None | |
| Beryl | July 18–21 | 95 (60) | 1000 | Long Island, Massachusetts, Atlantic Canada | Minimal | None | |
| Emilia | July 21–28 | 100 (65) | 990 | Southwestern Mexico, Western Mexico, Baja California Peninsula, Southwestern United States | Minimal | None | |
| Prapiroon (Henry) | July 27– August 5 | 120 (75) | 970 | Caroline Islands, Mariana Islands, Taiwan, China | $984 million | 94 | |
| Fabio | July 31 – August 3 | 85 (50) | 1000 | None | None | None | |

=== August ===
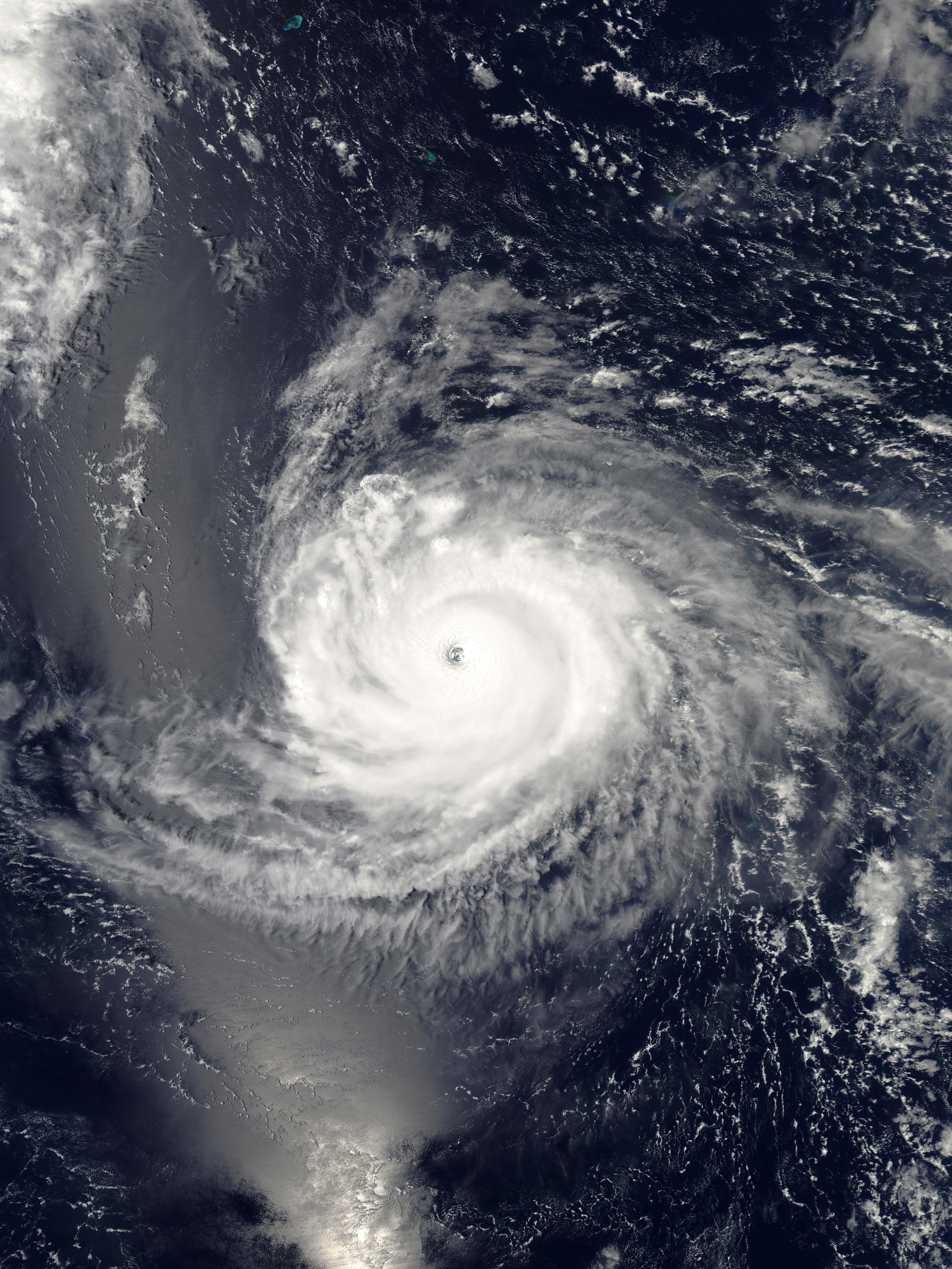
Hurricane Ioke

Tropical cyclones formed in August 2006
| Storm name | Dates active | Max wind km/h (mph) | Pressure (hPa) | Areas affected | Damage (USD) | Deaths | Refs |
|---|---|---|---|---|---|---|---|
| Chris | August 1–4 | 100 (65) | 1001 | Leeward Islands, Puerto Rico, Turks and Caicos Islands, Hispaniola, Bahamas, Cuba | Minimal | None | |
| Gilma | August 1–3 | 65 (40) | 1004 | None | None | None | |
| BOB 03 | August 2–5 | 55 (35) | 986 | East India | Unknown | 251 | |
| Maria | August 3–10 | 130 (80) | 975 | Japan | None | 1 | |
| Saomai (Juan) | August 5–11 | 195 (120) | 925 | Caroline Islands, Mariana Islands, Ryukyu Islands, Taiwan, China | $2.5 billion | 458 | |
| Bopha (Inday) | August 5–10 | 100 (65) | 980 | Taiwan, China | None | 7 | |
| Wukong | August 12–21 | 95 (60) | 980 | Taiwan, China | None | 2 | |
| BOB 04 | August 12–13 | 45 (30) | 992 | East India | Unknown | 78 | |
| Sonamu | August 13–16 | 65 (40) | 992 | None | None | None | |
| Hector | August 15–23 | 175 (110) | 966 | None | None | None | |
| BOB 05 | August 16–18 | 45 (30) | 988 | East India | Unknown | 49 | |
| Ioke | August 20– September 7 | 260 (160) | 915 | Johnston Atoll, Wake Island, Minamitorishima, Alaska | $88 million | None | |
| Illeana | August 21–27 | 205 (125) | 951 | Socorro Island | Minimal | 1 | |
| Debby | August 21–26 | 85 (50) | 999 | Cape Verde | None | None | |
| 13W | August 23–25 | 55 (35) | 1000 | China | None | None | |
| Ernesto | August 24– September 1 | 120 (75) | 985 | Lesser Antilles, Puerto Rico, Hispaniola, Cuba, East Coast of the United States, Canada | $500 million | 11 | |
| John | August 28– September 4 | 215 (130) | 948 | Guerrero, Michoacán, Baja California Sur, Arizona, California, New Mexico, Texas | $60.9 million | 5 | |
| BOB 05 | August 29– September 1 | 45 (30) | 990 | East India | Unknown | 9 | |
| Kristy | August 30– September 8 | 130 (80) | 985 | None | None | None | |

=== September ===
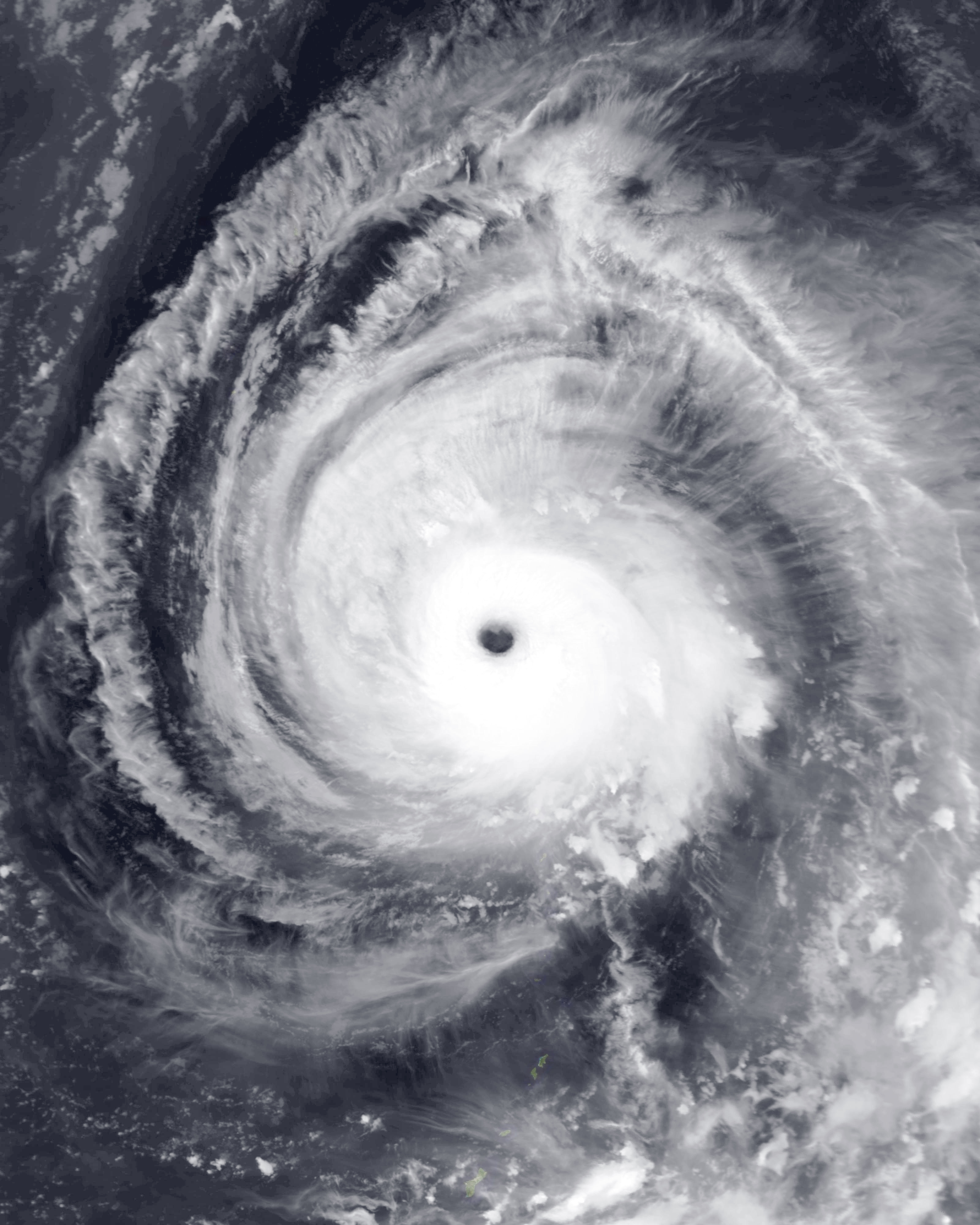
Typhoon Yagi

Tropical cyclones formed in September 2006
| Storm name | Dates active | Max wind km/h (mph) | Pressure (hPa) | Areas affected | Damage (USD) | Deaths | Refs |
|---|---|---|---|---|---|---|---|
| Florence | September 3–13 | 150 (90) | 974 | Bermuda, Newfoundland, East Coast of the United States, Canada | $200 thousand | None | |
| BOB 07 | September 3–4 | 45 (30) | 992 | Odisha | Unknown | 78 | |
| Shanshan (Luis) | September 9–18 | 205 (125) | 919 | Philippines, Taiwan, China, Korea | $2.5 billion | 11 | |
| Gordon | September 10–20 | 195 (120) | 955 | Azores, Iberian Peninsula, British Isles | $3.8 million | None | |
| Helene | September 12–24 | 195 (120) | 955 | British Isles | None | None | |
| 15W | September 12–15 | 55 (35) | 1004 | China | None | None | |
| Lane | September 13–17 | 205 (125) | 952 | Mexico, Southwestern United States | $203 million | 4 | |
| Miriam | September 16–18 | 75 (45) | 999 | None | None | None | |
| Unnamed | September 16–18 | 95 (60) | Unspecified | None | None | None | |
| Yagi | September 16–25 | 195 (120) | 910 | Japan | None | None | |
| Two-C | September 19–20 | 55 (35) | 1007 | None | None | None | |
| LAND 01 | September 21–24 | 45 (30) | 996 | East India, Bangladesh | Unknown | 98 | |
| Mukda | September 21–24 | 100 (65) | 988 | Gujarat | Unknown | None | |
| 17W | September 22–25 | 55 (35) | 996 | Vietnam, Laos | None | None | |
| Querida | September 25–27 | Unspecified | 986 | Atlas Mountains, Salento, Apulia | None | None | |
| Xangsane (Milenyo) | September 25 – October 2 | 155 (100) | 940 | Philippines, Vietnam, Laos, Cambodia, Thailand | $750 million | 318 | |
| Three-C | September 26–27 | 65 (35) | 1008 | None | None | None | |
| Isaac | September 27 – October 2 | 140 (85) | 985 | Newfoundland | Minimal | None | |
| BOB 08 | September 28–30 | 45 (30) | 1002 | Odisha | Unknown | None | |
| Bebinca | September 28 – October 6 | 95 (60) | 980 | Mariana Islands | None | 33 | |

=== October ===
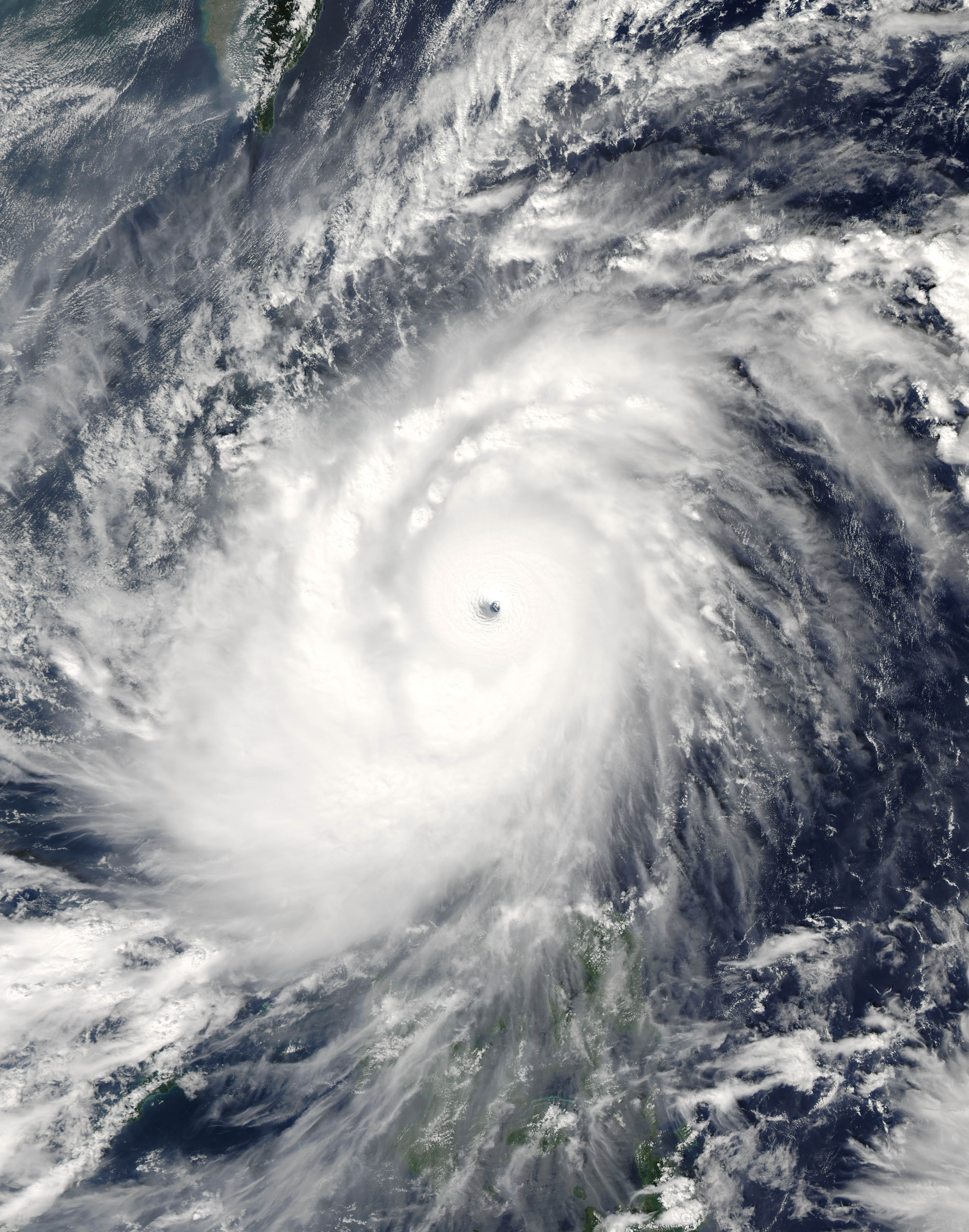
Typhoon Cimaron

Tropical cyclones formed in October 2006
| Storm name | Dates active | Max wind km/h (mph) | Pressure (hPa) | Areas affected | Damage (USD) | Deaths | Refs |
|---|---|---|---|---|---|---|---|
| Rumbia | October 3–6 | 85 (50) | 980 | None | None | None | |
| Soulik | October 8–16 | 140 (85) | 955 | None | None | None | |
| Norman | October 9–15 | 85 (50) | 1000 | Mexico | Minimal | None | |
| Olivia | October 9–12 | 45 (75) | 1000 | None | None | None | |
| Ompong | October 12–13 | 55 (35) | 1000 | None | None | None | |
| 01 | October 19–23 | 45 (30) | 1002 | None | None | None | |
| Xavier | October 21–28 | 175 (110) | 930 | Solomon Islands, Vanuatu | Minimal | None | |
| Paul | October 21–26 | 165 (105) | 970 | Mexico | $3.2 million | 4 | |
| TD | October 21–23 | Unspecified | 1008 | None | None | None | |
| TD | October 22 | Unspecified | 1010 | None | None | None | |
| TD | October 22 | Unspecified | 1004 | None | None | None | |
| 02F | October 24–29 | Unspecified | 1004 | None | None | None | |
| Cimaron | October 25–November 6 | 185 (115) | 920 | Caroline Islands, Philippines | $31 million | 35 | |
| Eighteen-E | October 26–27 | 55 (35) | 1007 | None | None | None | |
| Ogni | October 29–30 | 65 (40) | 998 | South India, Sri Lanka | $353 million | 35 | |

=== November ===
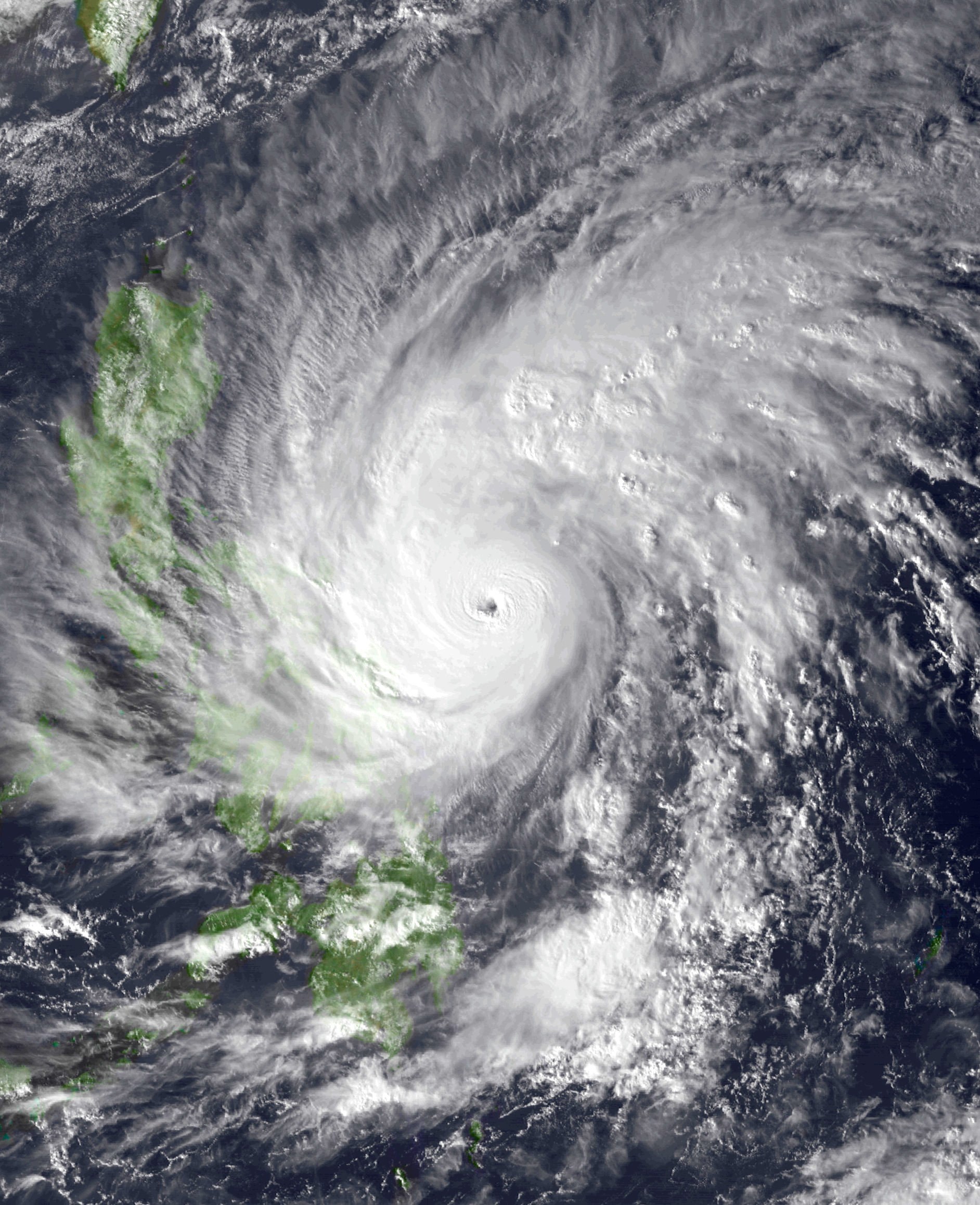
Typhoon Durian

Tropical cyclones formed in November 2006
| Storm name | Dates active | Max wind km/h (mph) | Pressure (hPa) | Areas affected | Damage (USD) | Deaths | Refs |
|---|---|---|---|---|---|---|---|
| 03F | November 1–3 | Not specified | 1004 | None | None | None | |
| Rosa | November 8–10 | 65 (40) | 1002 | None | None | None | |
| Chebi (Queenie) | November 8–14 | 185 (115) | 925 | Philippines, Hong Kong, Vietnam | Unknown | 1 | |
| Twenty-E | November 11 | 55 (35) | 1007 | None | None | None | |
| Sergio | November 13–20 | 175 (110) | 965 | Guerrero | None | None | |
| Yani | November 16–26 | 140 (85) | 960 | Solomon Islands | Unknown | Unknown | |
| Durian (Reming) | November 25–December 9 | 195 (120) | 915 | Yap State, Philippines, Vietnam, Thailand, Malaysia, Andaman Islands, India | $580 million | >1,500 | |
| Anita | November 26–December 4 | 65 (40) | 996 | Madagascar, Mozambique | Unknown | None | |
| 05F | November 29–December 4 | 55 (35) | 997 | Solomon Islands, Vanuatu | Unknown | Unknown | |

=== December ===
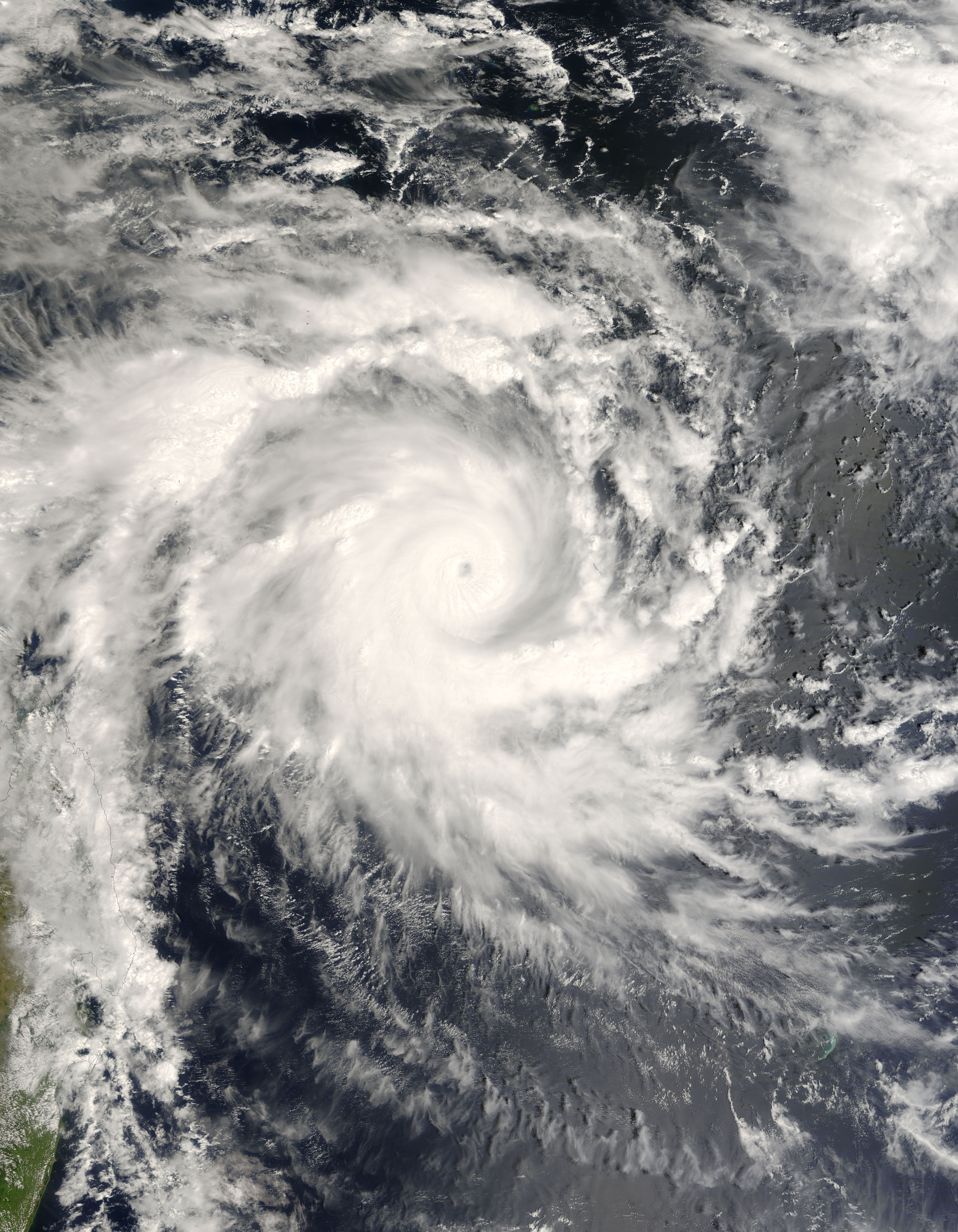
Cyclone Bondo

Tropical cyclones formed in December 2006
| Storm name | Dates active | Max wind km/h (mph) | Pressure (hPa) | Areas affected | Damage (USD) | Deaths | Refs |
|---|---|---|---|---|---|---|---|
| Utor (Seniang) | December 7–15 | 155 (100) | 945 | Philippines, Paracel Islands, Malaysia | $15.8 million | 38 | |
| Tomas | December 15–20 | 65 (40) | 1000 | Caroline Islands, Mariana Islands | None | None | |
| Bondo | December 15–28 | 205 (125) | 930 | Agaléga, Seychelles, Madagascar | Unknown | 11 | |
| 04 | December 22–28 | 45 (30) | 1000 | None | None | None | |
| Clovis | December 25–January 4 | 115 (70) | 978 | Madagascar | Unknown | 4 | |
| Isobel | December 30–January 5 | 85 (50) | 982 | None | None | None | |

== Global effects ==
| Season name | Areas affected | Systems formed | Named storms | Damage (USD) | Deaths |
|---|---|---|---|---|---|
| 2006 Atlantic hurricane season | Southeast United States, Atlantic Canada, East Coast of the United States, Leeward Islands, Puerto Rico, Turks and Caicos Islands, Hispaniola, Bahamas, Eastern Cuba, Cape Verde, Lesser Antilles, Bermuda, Newfoundland, Iceland, Greenland, Azores, Iberian Peninsula, British Isles, | 10 | 10 | $504.42 million | 14 |
| 2006 Pacific hurricane season | Southwestern Mexico, Western Mexico, Hawaii, Baja California Peninsula, Southwestern United States, Johnston Atoll, Wake Island, Minamitorishima, Southern Alaska, Socorro Island, Northwestern Mexico | 25 | 19 | $355.1 million | 14 |
| 2006 Pacific typhoon season | Philippines, Caroline Islands, Vietnam, China, Taiwan, Japan, Korean Peninsula, Ryukyu Islands, Mariana Islands, Vietnam, Laos, Cambodia, Thailand, Malaysia | 39 | 22 | $14.4 billion | 3,886 |
| 2006 North Indian Ocean cyclone season | Kerala, Lakshadweep, Andaman Islands, Myanmar, Northern Thailand, East India, Bangladesh, Gujarat, South India, Sri Lanka | 12 | 3 | $6.7 million | 623 |
| 2005–06 Australian region cyclone season | Western Australia, Far North Queensland, Northern Territory, Pilbara Coast | 15 | 11 | $1.1 billion | 1 |
| 2006–07 Australian region cyclone season | None | 1 | 1 | None | None reported |
| 2005–06 South-West Indian Ocean cyclone season | Mauritius, Réunion, Madagascar | 6 | 5 | None | Unknown |
| 2006–07 South-West Indian Ocean cyclone season | Agaléga, Seychelles, Madagascar, Mozambique | 5 | 4 | None | 11 |
| 2005–06 South Pacific cyclone season | American Samoa, Rotuma, Niue, Tonga, Futuna, Tafahi, Niuatoputapu, Vavaʻu, Ha'apai, | 12 | 4 | $26,000 | None |
| 2006–07 South Pacific cyclone season | Solomon Islands, Vanuatu | 5 | 2 | None | None |
| Worldwide | (See above) | 130 | 81 | $16,36 billion | 4,549 |

== See also ==
- Tropical cyclones by year
- List of earthquakes in 2006
- Tornadoes of 2006

== Notes ==
^{1} Only systems that formed either on or after January 1, 2006 are counted in the seasonal totals.
^{2} Only systems that formed either before or on December 31, 2006 are counted in the seasonal totals.
^{3} The wind speeds for this tropical cyclone/basin are based on the IMD Scale which uses 3-minute sustained winds.
^{4} The wind speeds for this tropical cyclone/basin are based on the Saffir Simpson Scale which uses 1-minute sustained winds.
^{5}The wind speeds for this tropical cyclone are based on Météo-France which uses gust winds.
