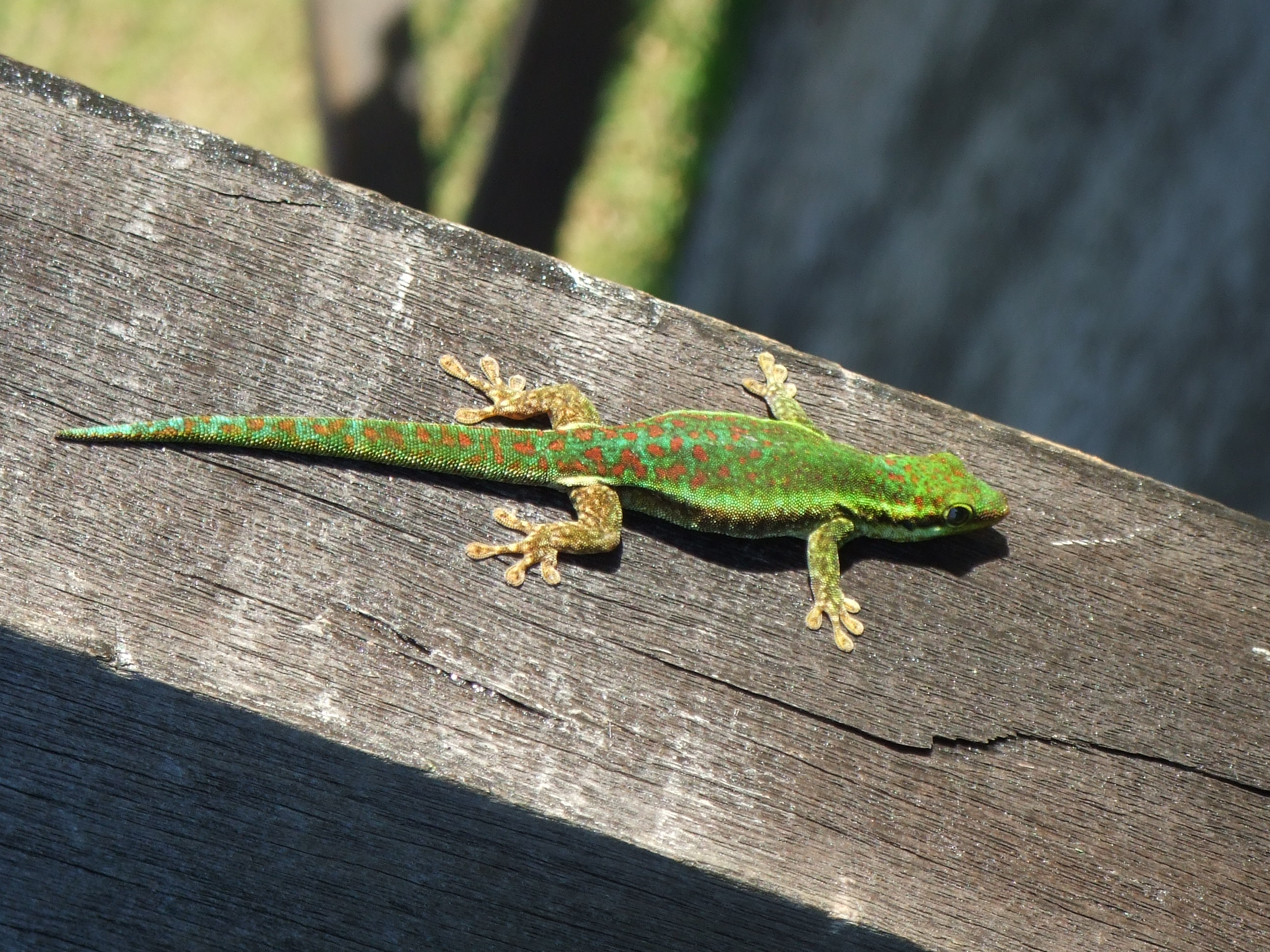

Conservation status
- Endangered (IUCN 3.1)

Scientific classification
- Kingdom: Animalia
- Phylum: Chordata
- Class: Reptilia
- Order: Squamata
- Suborder: Gekkota
- Family: Gekkonidae
- Genus: Phelsuma
- Species: P. borbonica

Binomial name
- Phelsuma borbonica Mertens, 1966
- Approximate distribution Range Depicted: Reunion Island, Southern Africa

Synonyms
- Phelsuma cepediana borbonica Mertens, 1942: 97 (1966 fide Kluge, 1993); Phelsuma agalegae Cheke, 1975

= Réunion Island day gecko =

Species of lizard

The Reunion Island day gecko (Phelsuma borbonica) is a species of gecko. It is diurnal and lives in northern Réunion. It typically dwells on banana trees and feeds on insects and nectar.

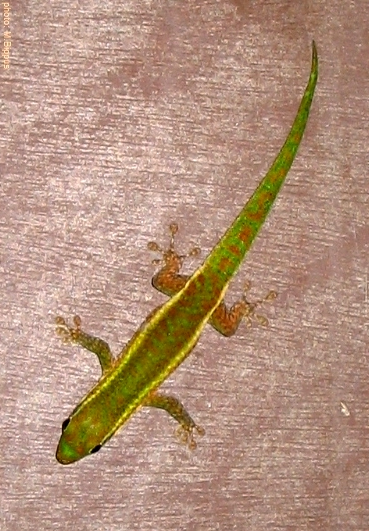
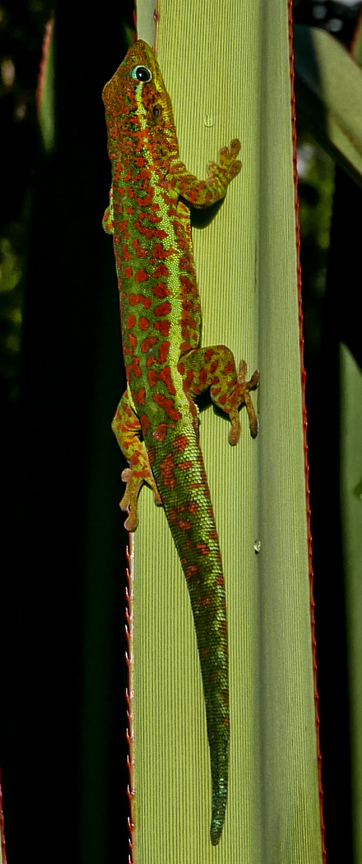
Reunion Island day gecko

== Description ==
This lizard belongs to the middle-sized day geckos. It can reach a total length of about 16 cm.

The colour can vary, depending on which population they belong to. The body colour is bluish green or dark green. The head has a yellowish colour, finely mottled with brown. On the back and tail there are brownish or red-brick coloured dots which form a network of reticulated bars. The red spots on the head and neck are smaller and denser than those on the back. The ventral surface is yellowish with brown marbling.

== Taxonomy ==
Three subspecies are currently recognized:

- P. b. borbonica Mertens, 1966
- P. b. mater Meier, 1995
- P. b. agalegae Cheke, 1975

== Distribution ==
This species only inhabits northern part of Réunion. It was found at; Les Hauts du Brûlé, Les Hauts Mensiol, Morne de Patates à Durand, near Bois de Nèfles, Belle-Vue, La Bretagne, Beaumont les Hauts, near St.Marie and Les Hauts de la Perrière near St. Suzanne.

== Diet ==
These day geckos feed on various insects and other invertebrates. They also like to lick soft, sweet fruit, pollen and nectar.

== Care and maintenance in captivity ==
These animals should be housed in pairs and need a large, well planted terrarium. The temperature should be between 25 and 28 °C. The humidity should be maintained between 75 and 100. In captivity, these animals can be fed with crickets, wax moths, fruit flies, mealworms and houseflies.

== Additional sources ==
Henkel, F.-W. and W. Schmidt (1995) Amphibien und Reptilien Madagaskars, der Maskarenen, Seychellen und Komoren. Ulmer Stuttgart. ISBN 3-8001-7323-9
McKeown, Sean (1993) The general care and maintenance of day geckos. Advanced Vivarium Systems, Lakeside CA.
