= Cyclone Glenda =

Category 5 Australian region cyclone in 2006

Severe Tropical Cyclone Glenda
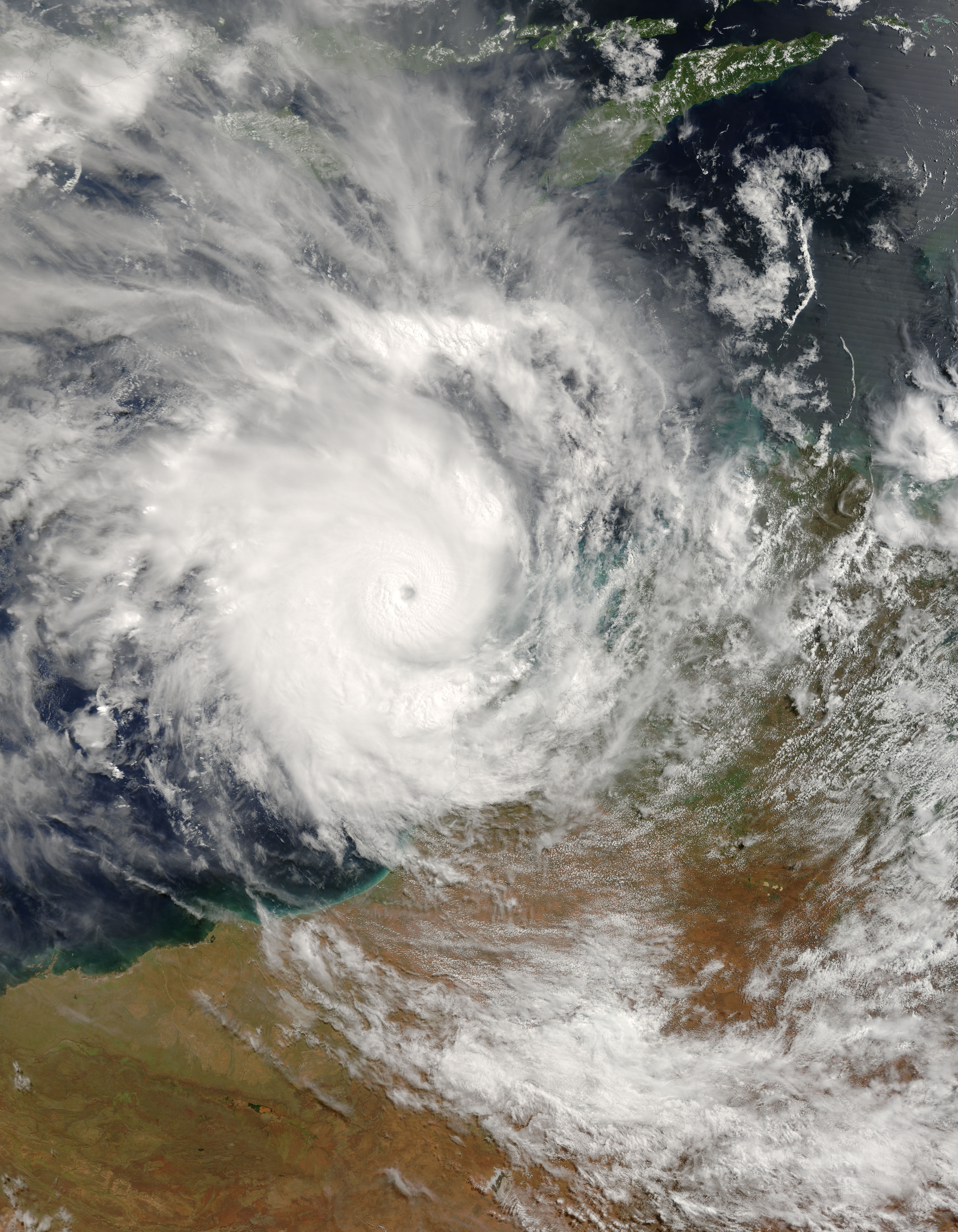
- Glenda prior to peak intensity on 28 March

Meteorological history
- Formed: 23 March 2006
- Dissipated: 31 March 2006

Category 5 severe tropical cyclone
- 10-minute sustained (BOM)
- Highest winds: 205 km/h (125 mph)
- Lowest pressure: 910 hPa (mbar); 26.87 inHg

Category 4-equivalent tropical cyclone
- 1-minute sustained (SSHWS/JTWC)
- Highest winds: 220 km/h (140 mph)
- Lowest pressure: 922 hPa (mbar); 27.23 inHg

Overall effects
- Fatalities: None
- Damage: $965,000 (2006 USD)
- Areas affected: Western Australia
- IBTrACS
- Part of the 2005–06 Australian region cyclone season

Severe Tropical Cyclone Glenda was among the strongest tropical cyclones to threaten Western Australia, though it weakened considerably before landfall and moved ashore in a lightly populated region. It began as a tropical low on 15 March in the Gulf of Carpentaria. The precursor disturbance drifted over Top End and later across the northeastern portion of Western Australia, and after emerging into the Indian Ocean it strengthened into a tropical storm. Aided by favourable environmental conditions, Glenda rapidly intensified to reach Category 5 status on the Australian cyclone scale, and with a peak intensity of 910 mbar it was among the strongest cyclones on record within the Australia region. On 30 March it moved ashore near Onslow as a Category 3 cyclone, and the next day it degenerated into a remnant tropical low over land.

The precursor disturbance produced heavy rainfall in the Kimberley region of Western Australia, causing record flooding and some road damage. Minor damage was reported at the final landfall of Glenda. Due to the sparse population and preparations made, the cyclone was not responsible for any deaths or injuries. However, its name was later retired from the list of tropical cyclone names.

Glenda is also tied with Yagi which became the most intense tropical cyclone in worldwide in 2006.

== Meteorological history ==
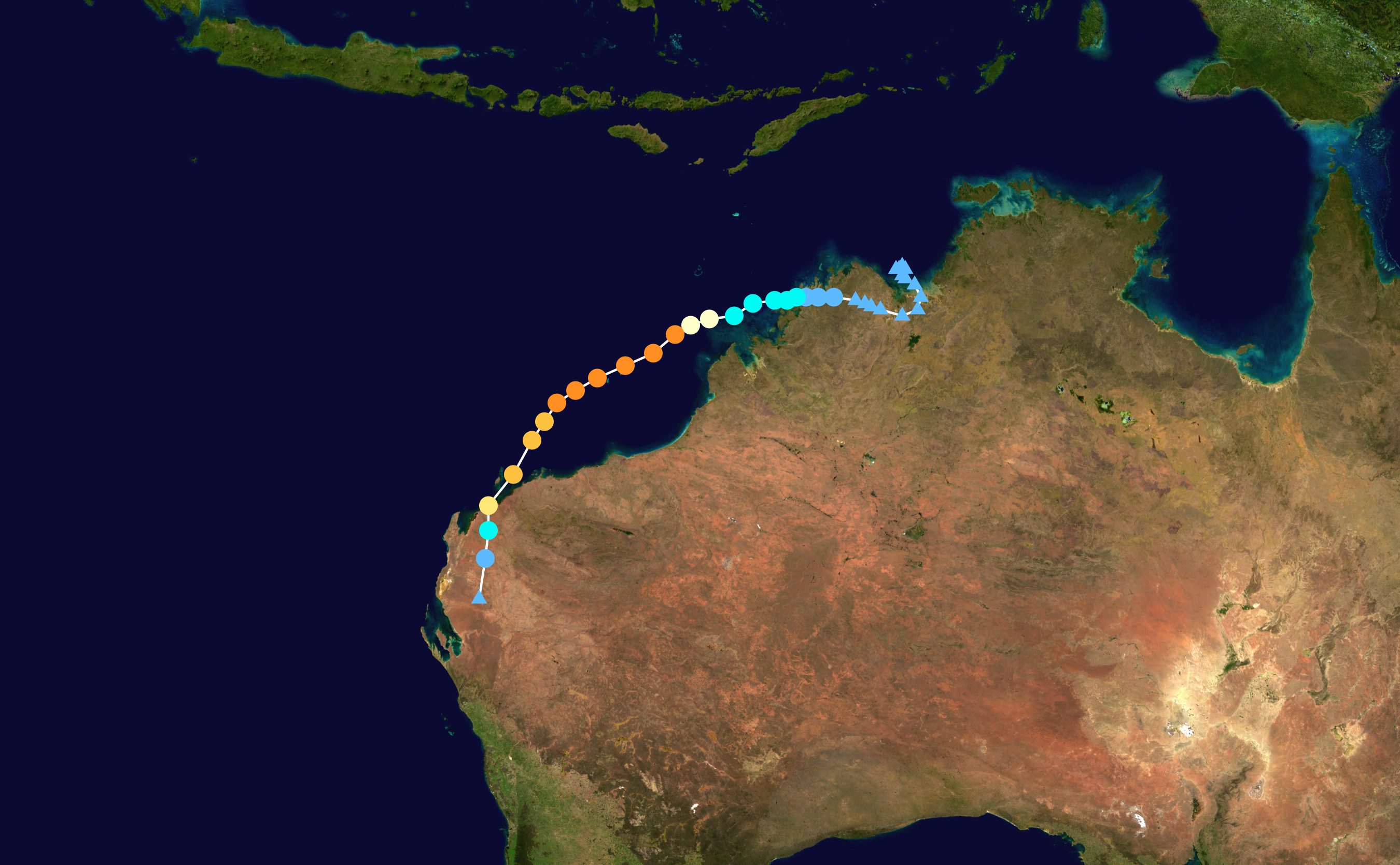
Map plotting the storm's track and intensity, according to the Saffir–Simpson scale Map key Saffir–Simpson scale Tropical depression (≤38 mph, ≤62 km/h) Tropical storm (39–73 mph, 63–118 km/h) Category 1 (74–95 mph, 119–153 km/h) Category 2 (96–110 mph, 154–177 km/h) Category 3 (111–129 mph, 178–208 km/h) Category 4 (130–156 mph, 209–251 km/h) Category 5 (≥157 mph, ≥252 km/h) Unknown Storm type Tropical cyclone Subtropical cyclone Extratropical cyclone, remnant low, tropical disturbance, or monsoon depression

On 15 March, a tropical disturbance developed in the south-western Gulf of Carpentaria. It moved westward, drifting across Top End, and it exited into the Joseph Bonaparte Gulf on 22 March. The Bureau of Meteorology (BoM) office in Darwin, which is the local Tropical Cyclone Warning Centre, began issuing advisories on the system late on 23 March while it was located about 85 km (53 mi) east-south-east of Wyndham, Western Australia. Environmental conditions favored intensification as an anticyclone developed over the storm, which provided good outflow and low vertical wind shear. Initially, the primary inhibiting factor was land interaction. After executing a small loop over water, the disturbance continued westward, crossing over the northern portion of Western Australia before emerging into the Indian Ocean on 26 March. It began tracking west-southwestward just offshore of the Kimberley coastline, and its convection quickly concentrated. At 0000 UTC on 27 March, the Joint Typhoon Warning Center (JTWC) classified it as Tropical Cyclone 20S. Three hours later, the BoM office in Perth upgraded the storm to Tropical Cyclone Glenda about 260 km (160 mi) north of Derby, Western Australia.

Upon reaching open waters, Glenda quickly intensified, and midday on 27 March the BoM upgraded it to tropical cyclone status, or the equivalence of a minimal hurricane. Shortly thereafter, the JTWC followed suit by upgrading it to cyclone status just 12 hours after first warning on the storm. A wind gust of 113 km/h (70 mph) was reported on Adele Island as the cyclone passed nearby. The track turned south westward around a steering ridge over Australia, aided by a mid-latitude trough. By 27 March, Glenda had developed a banding eye, and subsequently began rapid deepening, with warm water temperatures of over 30 °C (86 °F) and a very favourable upper-level environment. At 1200 UTC on 28 March, the JTWC classified Glenda with peak winds of 260 km/h (160 mph) about 235 km (146 mi) west-north-west of Broome, or about 455 km (283 mi) north-north-east of Port Hedland; however, in a subsequent analysis, the JTWC lowered their intensity estimate to 220 km/h (140 mph). At the same time the BoM estimated the cyclone attained peak winds of 205 km/h (125 mph) with gusts to 295 km/h (185 mph), or a Category 5 on the Australian cyclone scale. Its peak intensity of 910 mbar was tied for the fifth most intense tropical cyclone on record in the Australian basin.

Initially, Cyclone Glenda was forecast to intensify further. However, a gradual increase in vertical shear caused the eye to become disorganised, with land interaction contributing to further weakening. The BoM maintained Glenda as a Category 5 cyclone until 29 March, and initially it was forecast to turn southward to move ashore near the populated region of Karratha at high tide. It retained its south west track and passed over several weather stations, one of which recorded sustained winds of 176 km/h (109 mph). Glenda made landfall near the less populated town of Onslow at around 10pm WST (1400 UTC) on 30 March. The cyclone had weakened to a marginal Category 3 at the time of landfall. The JTWC issued its final warning on Glenda shortly after it moved ashore. The cyclone turned south and south-south-eastward and rapidly weakened over land in an area of increasing wind shear, and early on 31 March the BoM downgraded Glenda to a tropical low.

== Preparations, impact and aftermath ==
Most intense Australian cyclones
Rank	Cyclone	Year	Min. pressure
1	Gwenda	1999	900 hPa (26.58 inHg)
1	Inigo	2003	900 hPa (26.58 inHg)
3	George	2007	902 hPa (26.64 inHg)
4	Orson	1989	904 hPa (26.70 inHg)
5	Marcus	2018	905 hPa (26.72 inHg)
6	Theodore	1994	910 hPa (26.87 inHg)
6	Vance	1999	910 hPa (26.87 inHg)
6	Fay	2004	910 hPa (26.87 inHg)
6	Glenda	2006	910 hPa (26.87 inHg)
10	Mahina	1899	914 hPa (26.99 inHg) (Note: Currently, the World Meteorological Organization recognises the lowest pressure of Cyclone Mahina as 27 inches of mercury (914 hPa) based on an observation from the time. A 2014 reconstruction project of Cyclone Mahina by the American Meteorological Society concluded that the 13 metre storm surge produced by the cyclone likely produced barometric pressure levels as low as 880 hPa, which would place it as the strongest tropical cyclone in the Southern Hemisphere, but the metric is not yet approved by the WMO.)
Source: Australian Bureau of Meteorology

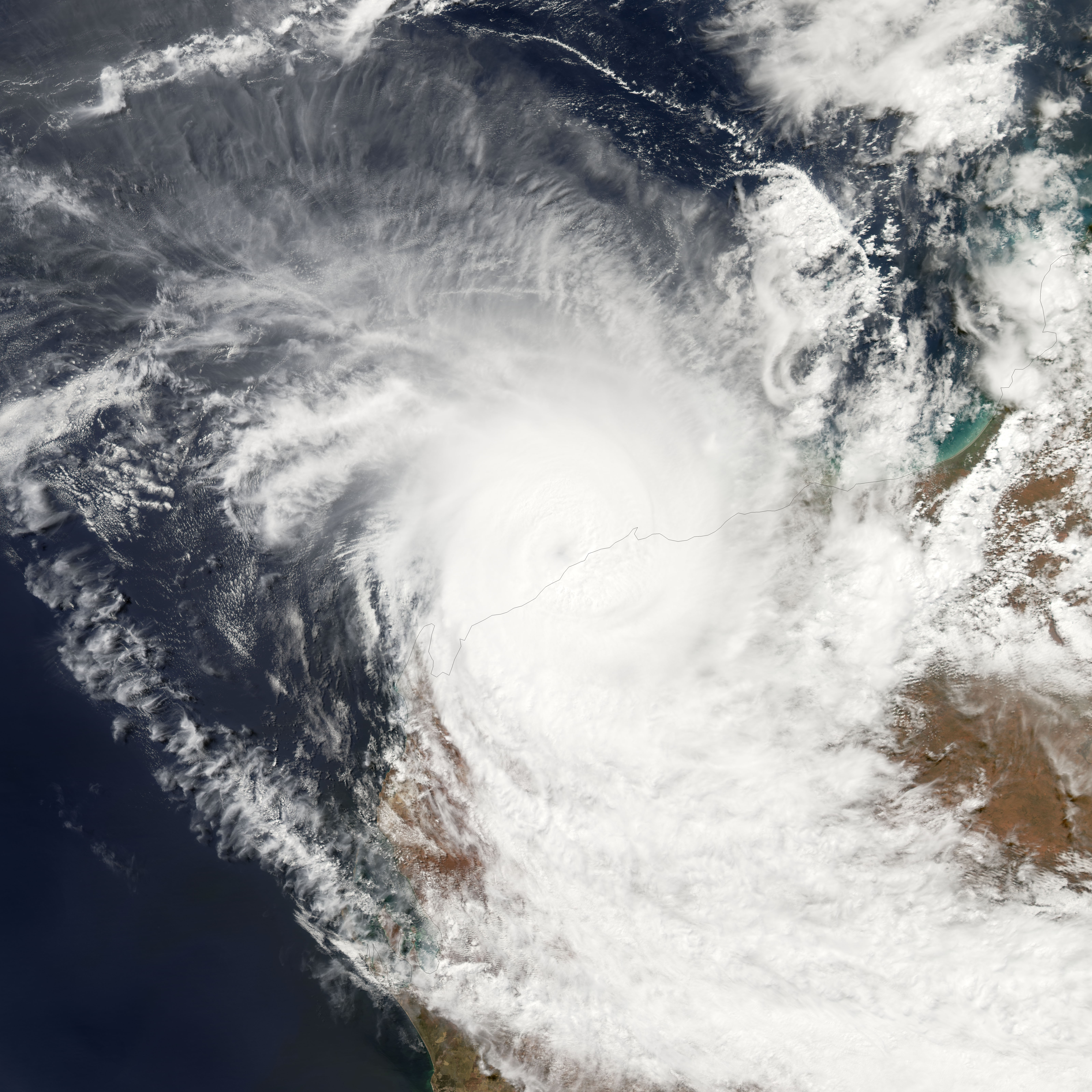
Cyclone Glenda near landfall on 30 March

The precursor system dropped heavy rainfall on 23 March in the eastern Kimberley in the state of Western Australia. The rainfall led to record flooding in the area; the flooding washed out several roads near Kununurra, including a portion of the Great Northern Highway. Six people were evacuated due to the flooding.

Offshore, the threat of Glenda prompted officials to close oil, representing a lack of production of 154,000 barrels of oil. Additionally, natural gas fields were closed, and several ports along the coastline were shut down during the passage of the storm. Prior to the storm's landfall, officials issued a Red Alert for several communities. Storm shelters were opened in Karratha and Onslow, while a few hundred people evacuated along the coastline.

Glenda made landfall near Onslow, where sustained winds reached 117 km/h (73 mph). There, the storm produced a 24‑hour rainfall total of 206 mm (8.1 in), which is the sixth greatest daily precipitation on record in the town. Several other locations reported over 200 mm (7.9 in), though overall precipitation was less than a usual landfalling tropical cyclone. The rainfall flooded several roads. The winds downed several trees and power lines, which left about 2,000 people in Karratha without electricity; the power outage was quickly repaired. Several windows at the hospital in Onslow were broken, resulting in some minor water damage. Overall damage was minor, and no deaths or injuries were reported, which was credited to the storm's weakening and preparations in the landfall area. In all, damages from the storm amounted to A$1.2 million (US$965,000). The disruption to shipping companies resulted in economic losses of A$30 million (US$24.1 million). Oil companies reported a loss of 500 tonnes during the economic quarter due to the cyclone. The Onslow Salt company reported upwards of A$20 million (US$16 million) in lost revenue.

Following the storm, residents and companies affected by the storm were allowed to file insurance claims. About A$240,000 (US$193,000) was filed in repair claims for council buildings and A$69,000 (US$55,000) in airport insurance. About A$99,000 (US$79,000) and A$300,000 (US$241,000) was provided in financial support for television and broadcasting infrastructure and aerodrome infrastructure respectively.

The Bureau of Meteorology retired the name Glenda following its usage.

== See also ==
- Geography of Western Australia
- List of the most intense tropical cyclones
