= Agalega day gecko =

Scientific classification
- Domain: Eukaryota
- Kingdom: Animalia
- Phylum: Chordata
- Class: Reptilia
- Order: Squamata
- Infraorder: Gekkota
- Family: Gekkonidae
- Genus: Phelsuma
- Species: P. borbonica
- Subspecies: P. b. agalegae

Trinomial name
- Phelsuma borbonica agalegae Cheke, 1975

Subspecies of lizard

Agalega day gecko (Phelsuma borbonica agalegae Cheke, 1975) is a subspecies of geckos.

== General introduction ==
This diurnal gecko only lives on the Agaléga Islands. It typically inhabits coconut trees or cheval trees. The Agalega day gecko feeds on insects and nectar.

== Description ==
This lizard belongs to the medium-sized day geckos. Males are slightly larger than females and can reach a total length of about 16 cm whereas females measure only 13.5 cm. The basic body colour is grayish green. Both the head and the neck are yellow-brown. The tail and back can be bright turquoise. The flanks are grey or beige. The dorso-lateral bands are turquoise. On the back and tail there are brownish or red-brick coloured dots or bars.

== Distribution ==
This species is endemic to the two Agalega islets.

== Habitat ==
The two islands where P. borbonica agalega occurs, are small low coral sand islands. On these islands are mainly coconut tree plantations. The Agalega day gecko is often found on these trees as well as on Terminalia spec. and mango trees.

== Diet ==
These day geckos feed on various insects and other invertebrates. They also like to lick soft, sweet fruit, pollen and nectar.

== Behaviour ==
This Phelsuma species is rather shy.

== Reproduction ==
The pairing season is between April and the first weeks of September. During this period, the females lay up to 4 pairs of eggs, often under loose bark of coconut trees. Females often share the same location for their eggs. The young will hatch after approximately 70–100 days, depending on the temperature. The juveniles measure 45–50 mm.

== Care and maintenance in captivity ==
These animals should be housed in pairs and need a large, well planted terrarium. The temperature should be between 24 and 30 °C. During the night the temperature can drop to 18–22 °C. The relative humidity should be maintained between 40 and 60% during the day and 75% at night. These animals can be fed with crickets, wax moths, fruit flies, mealworms and houseflies.
