= Typhoon Ewiniar (2006) =

Pacific typhoon in 2006

Typhoon Ewiniar (Ester)
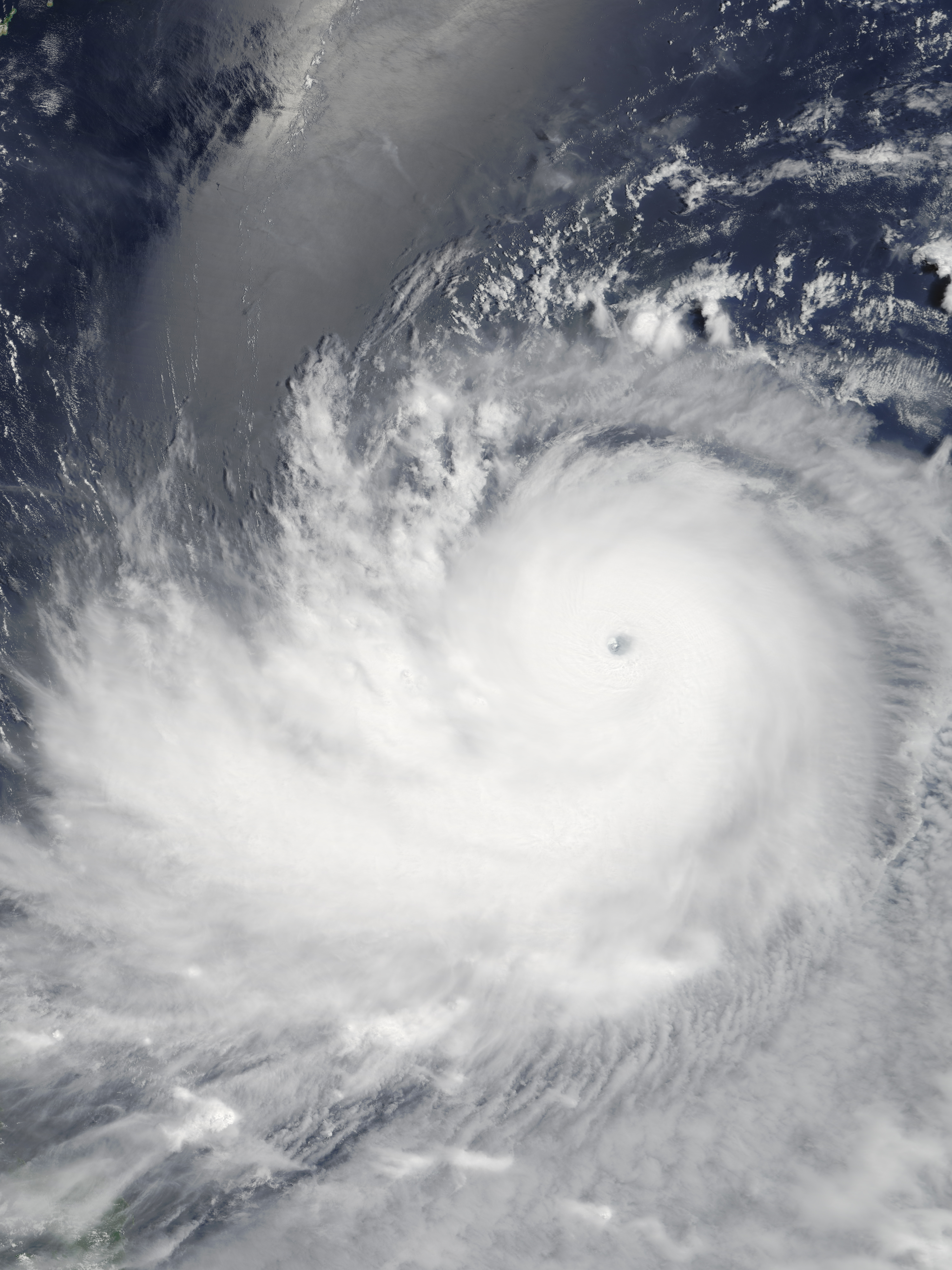
- Typhoon Ewiniar near peak intensity on July 5

Meteorological history
- Formed: June 29, 2006
- Extratropical: July 10, 2006
- Dissipated: July 13, 2006

Very strong typhoon
- 10-minute sustained (JMA)
- Highest winds: 185 km/h (115 mph)
- Lowest pressure: 930 hPa (mbar); 27.46 inHg

Category 4-equivalent super typhoon
- 1-minute sustained (SSHWS/JTWC)
- Highest winds: 240 km/h (150 mph)
- Lowest pressure: 910 hPa (mbar); 26.87 inHg

Overall effects
- Fatalities: 203
- Damage: $1.4 billion (2006 USD)
- Areas affected: Palau, Yap, China, Japan, Korean Peninsula
- IBTrACS
- Part of the 2006 Pacific typhoon season

Typhoon Ewiniar, (Note: The name Ewiniar (Chuukese: Éwúniyár, [əwɨnijar]) was contributed by the Federated States of Micronesia and refers to a storm god in Chuukese.) known in the Philippines as Typhoon Ester, was the third named storm of the 2006 Pacific typhoon season that lasted for twelve days as a tropical cyclone, moving on a generally northward track. During its lifespan, it affected Palau, Yap, eastern China, the Ryūkyū Islands of Japan, South Korea as well as North Korea, briefly threatening to make landfall in North Korea before doing so in South Korea. Ewiniar is responsible for at least 181 deaths. However, an unofficial report stated that up to 10,000 people had been killed by flooding in North Korea, with 4,000 people missing.

== Meteorological history ==
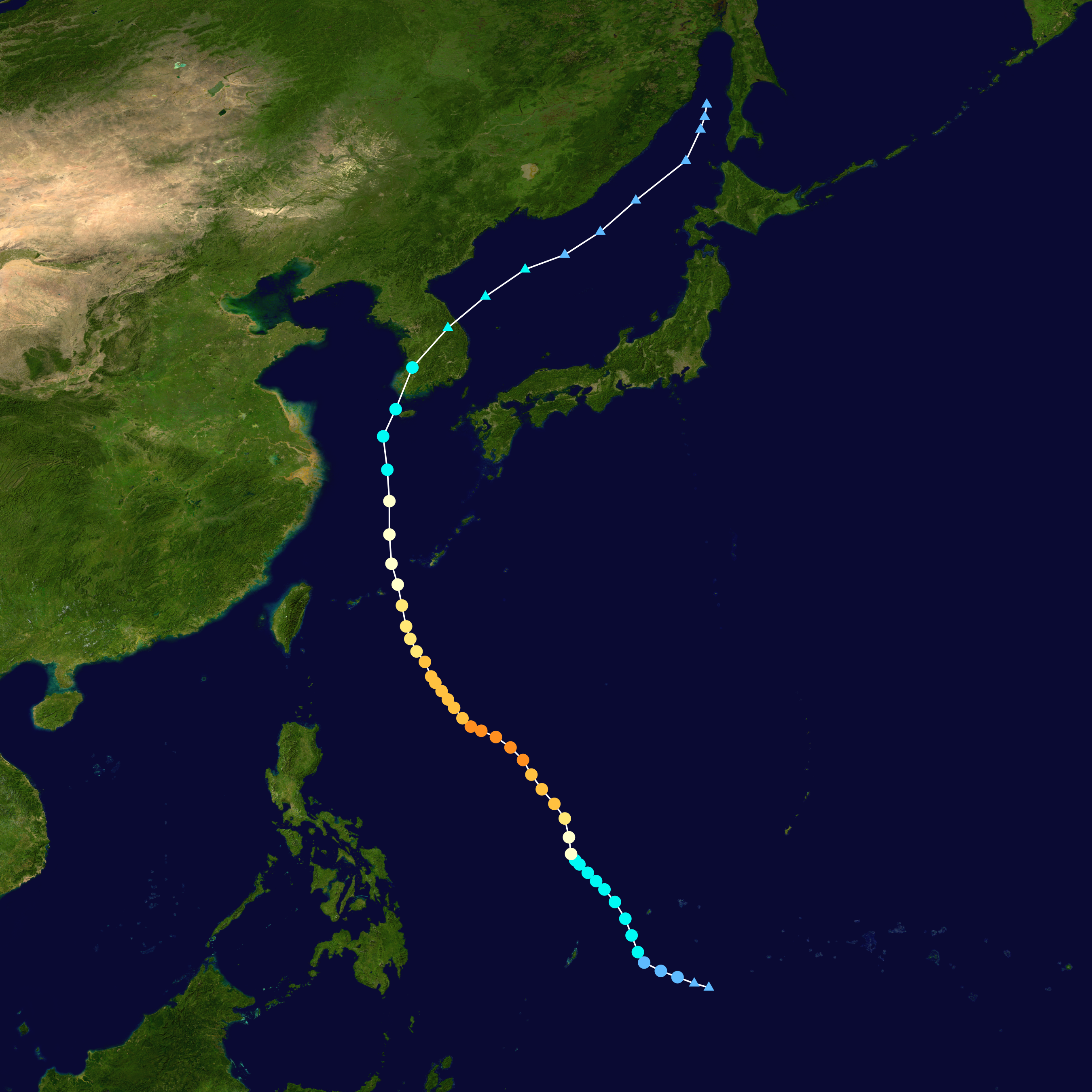
Map plotting the storm's track and intensity, according to the Saffir–Simpson scale Map key Saffir–Simpson scale Tropical depression (≤38 mph, ≤62 km/h) Tropical storm (39–73 mph, 63–118 km/h) Category 1 (74–95 mph, 119–153 km/h) Category 2 (96–110 mph, 154–177 km/h) Category 3 (111–129 mph, 178–208 km/h) Category 4 (130–156 mph, 209–251 km/h) Category 5 (≥157 mph, ≥252 km/h) Unknown Storm type Tropical cyclone Subtropical cyclone Extratropical cyclone, remnant low, tropical disturbance, or monsoon depression

On June 29, a persistent tropical disturbance was classified as a tropical depression by the JTWC while east of Palau. The depression moved northwestward and was upgraded to Tropical Storm 04W by the JTWC the next day on June 30, while the JMA named the storm Tropical Storm Ewiniar at around the same time.

Ewiniar moved west-northwestward over the next two days, bringing heavy rain and localized flooding to the Yap Islands. Ewiniar turned to the northwest and reached its peak intensity of 130 knots (240 km/h or 150 mph) on the U.S. method of measuring windspeeds by one-minute averages, or 100 knots (185 km/h or 115 mph) on the international method of measuring windspeeds by ten-minute averages, and its minimum pressure of 930 hPa (mbar). Ewiniar turned northward and brushed eastern China, forcing evacuations in many cities.

Ewiniar gradually weakened as it moved over colder waters, and made landfall in South Korea on July 10 as a severe tropical storm, having briefly threatened to make landfall on North Korea. Ewiniar passed within 50 km (31 mi) of Seoul as it moved across the country before becoming extratropical over the Sea of Japan the next day. Ewiniar had also earlier brushed the Ryūkyū Islands of Japan.

== Preparations ==
=== People's Republic of China ===
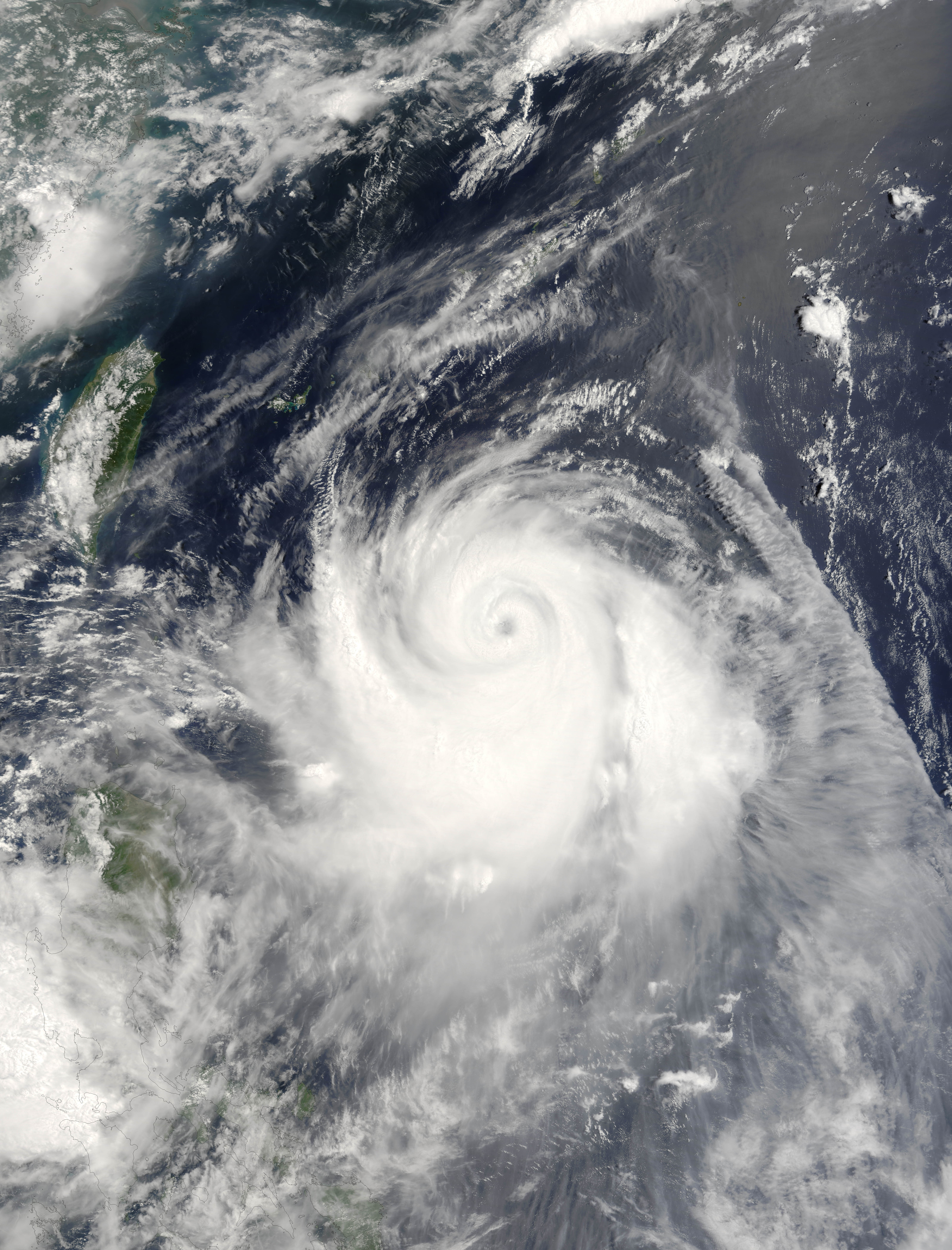
Typhoon Ewininar approaching the Ryūkyū Islands on July 7

As Ewiniar started to threaten the coast of China, the government in Beijing ordered emergency evacuations for all villagers in low-lying areas. A reported 7,634 people were evacuated from Ningbo, and over 8,000 ships were asked to return to dock in harbours in Ningbo and Zhoushan. The municipal flood control headquarters in Shanghai also asked officials to prepare for the approaching typhoon, which was forecast to begin affecting the city on July 9.

=== Japan ===
As Ewiniar started to approach the Ryūkyū Islands, Sasebo Naval Base in Kyūshū announced a Tropical Cyclone Condition of Readiness 3 at 4 p.m. local time on July 7, while a day earlier, on July 6, USS Harpers Ferry had unanchored from the harbour for an area of safer weather conditions. USS Essex also evacuated the area on July 7. USS Juneau and USS Bowditch, however, both remained anchored in Sasebo, while USS Guardian and USS Safeguard were both moved to a nearby dry dock.

All United States military stations and bases on Okinawa were put into a Tropical Cyclone Condition of Readiness 2 on July 7 with an upgrade to a Condition of Readiness 1 expected the following day, and Commander's Cup softball tournaments that had been scheduled for the weekend of July 8 and July 9 at Camp Hansen and Marine Corps Air Station Futenma had to be postponed. Tropical Cyclone Condition of Readiness 1E, which means that all outdoor activities are prohibited as there are sustained winds of at least 50 knots (93 km/h; 58 mph) in force, was declared early on the morning of July 9.

=== South Korea ===
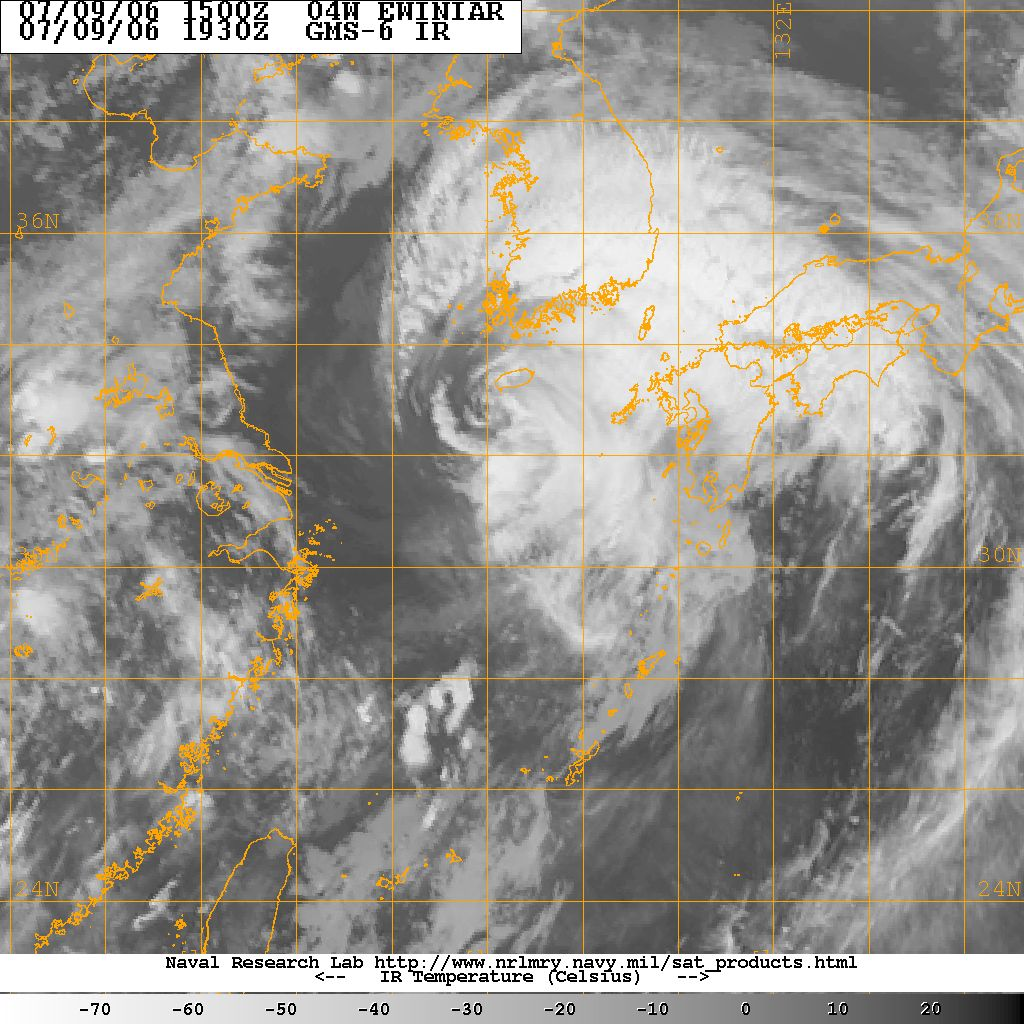
Severe Tropical Storm Ewiniar southwest of Jeju-do, shortly before landfall in South Korea on July 9.

As Ewiniar cleared the Ryūkyū Islands and began to threaten the Korean Peninsula, the Korea Meteorological Administration issued typhoon warnings for most of the country. The KMA also issued typhoon advisories for Liancourt Rocks and Ulleungdo.

United States Navy commands in South Korea were put into a Tropical Cyclone Condition of Readiness level 3, with Condition of Readiness 2 declared on July 8. TCCOR Level 1 was later declared by United States Forces Korea, which was cancelled after landfall on July 10.

== Impact ==
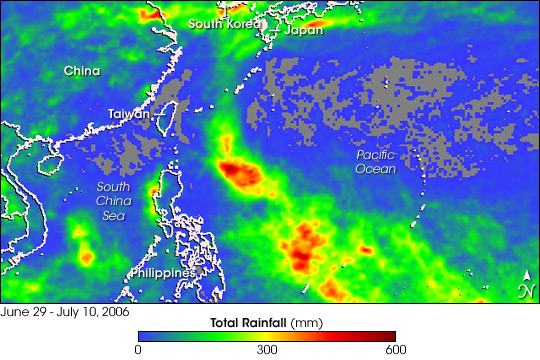
Total rainfall from June 29 through July 10 in the Western North Pacific. The areas with the most rainfall mark out Ewiniar's track. The moderate to isolated heavy rainfall near the top of the image is unrelated to Typhoon Ewiniar.

Ewiniar affected many areas due to its track and relatively long life, killing at least 40 people along the way and leaving much damage in its path.

=== Yap and Palau ===
Early in its life as a tropical cyclone, Ewiniar affected Yap and Palau, which fall under the warning jurisdiction of the National Weather Service office in Tiyan, Guam. Ewiniar caused coastal flooding in Yap of up to 5 feet (1.5 m), especially near the port and around the Colonia Bay area. Ewiniar also caused an island-wide power outage in Yap, although according to an NWS post-storm report, damage was minimised on Yap due to steadier structures after Super Typhoon Sudal of 2004 tore through the islands. Damage was also reported to agriculture due to salt spray. The total amount of damage caused was estimated to be just over $100 thousand (2006 USD).

About 2.4 inches (61 mm) of rain fell on Yap, while Koror in Palau reported a 24-hour total of 1.88 inches (48 mm) of rain through 6 a.m. UTC on July 3. The peak wind gusts reported were 53 knots (98 km/h, 61 mph) on Yap at the Weather Service Office (WSO) in Yap and 46 knots (85 km/h, 53 mph) at the WSO in Koror. During its course through the islands, Tropical Storm Ewiniar also necessitated tropical storm warnings and watches for Ngulu, Yap, Koror and Kayangel. No deaths in Yap or Palau were reported due to Ewiniar.

=== People's Republic of China ===
Typhoon Ewiniar killed at least 34 people in China, with areas as far northwest as Gansu and Shanxi affected by landslides. It is not known if the landslides were triggered directly as a result of Ewiniar, or whether it was caused by a combination of Ewiniar and other weather. Therefore, the deaths that can be attributed to Ewiniar from the landslides are assumed to be indirectly caused, and not directly. Average rainfall reported in Shandong was 3.4 mm (0.133 inches) per hour from 6 a.m. July 9 through midnight July 10 (totalling about 61.2 mm or 2.4 inches). At least 300 flights out of Beijing's Capital International Airport had to be delayed due to thunderstorms and effects of Ewiniar, while Air China and China Eastern Airlines cancelled flights to South Korea heading out of China. As Ewiniar did not affect the mainland directly, there are little to no reports of major damage.

=== Japan ===
Ewiniar hammered Okinawa with heavy rain, creating mass confusion and troubles for tourists. Flights and ferries out of Okinawa to neighbouring islands were cancelled, and as many as 3,500 tourists were left stranded at various airports because most hotels were already near full capacity. Other tourists reportedly stayed in the homes of some Okinawa residents, while some residents in landslide-prone areas evacuated to higher ground. Seven people were injured in Nanjo from a fallen signboard, while an elderly woman in Nago City and a young girl in Yaese suffered wind-related injuries.

The highest winds reported during the storm were 34.9 m/s (78 mph, 126 km/h). These winds blew sand about 7 cm (3 in) deep off the beach and into residents' yards. Typhoon Ewiniar caused a reported ¥20 million ($173,000) worth of sugar cane and vegetable damage, and farmers experienced profit losses when ripe fruits were unable to be shipped to Asian markets.

=== South Korea ===
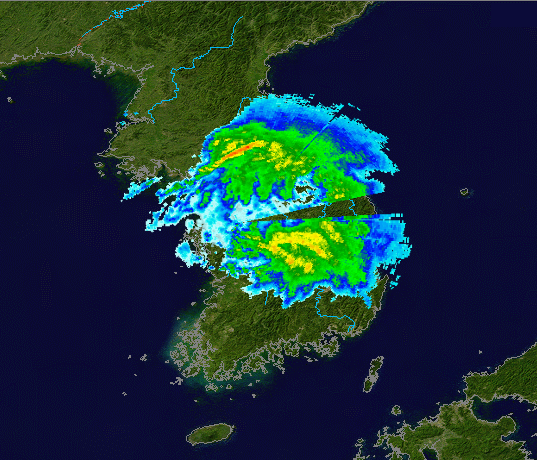
Radar image of Tropical Storm Ewiniar over Korean Peninsula on July 10

In South Korea, much damage was reported. 150 km^{2} (58 sq mi) of farmland was reported to have been flooded across the nation, while most domestic ferry and air travel was disrupted or cancelled. Landslides and flooding destroyed roads and levees, while in South Cholla province, a landslide damaged a temple. According to an official, floods also damaged over 600 homes and houses.

Rainfall totals varied from province to province. The KMA said up to 234 mm (9.36 inches) of rain had fallen on the southern areas of South Korea, while Hamyang County in South Kyongsang province reported a total rainfall of 199 mm (7.83 inches) to 260 mm (10.2 inches).

About 300 schools were ordered to be closed down in South Cholla, South Kyongsang and on Jeju. However, two injuries were reported at a school in Jeju which ignored the orders. Injuries were also reported elsewhere across South Korea, while 62 people were killed due to Ewiniar.

Alongside the effects of flooding immediately following Typhoon Ewiniar, damage throughout the country amounted to ₩2.06 trillion (US$1.4 billion).

=== North Korea ===
Due to the secrecy in North Korea, not much information is available on damage caused in the country. However, a TIME Asia report on North Korea noted that Ewiniar left 60,000 villagers homeless. Floods in the country killed at least 141 people and left 112 others missing. However, an unofficial report stated that as many as 10,000 people may have been killed. Another report indicated that the typhoon caused a "disaster of biblical proportions", with an estimated 54,700 people being killed, mainly by landslides.

== See also ==
- Weather of 2006
- Tropical cyclones in 2006
- Typhoon Sanba (2012)
- Typhoon Halong (2014)
- Typhoon Maysak (2020)
- Typhoon Hinnamnor (2022)
- Typhoon Khanun (2023)
