= Vingt-Cinq =

Human settlement in Mauritius

Geography
- Location: Indian Ocean
- Coordinates: 10°25′S 56°35′E
- Total islands: 2

Administration
- Mauritius
- Dependency: Agalega
- Largest settlement: Vingt-Cinq

Demographics
- Population: 250 (2000)
- Ethnic groups: Creole

Vingt-Cinq (French for 'twenty-five') is the capital of the Agaléga Islands, two islands in the Indian Ocean, governed by Mauritius.

== Location ==
It is located on the North Island, near a small airfield. In the town, there is a primary school (Jacques Le Chartier Government School) and a hospital. The name, Vingt-Cinq, is believed to refer to the number of lashes that slaves on the island received as punishment.

Vingt-Cinq is located north of Mauritius, and had a population of 200 in 2012. The people of the island are mostly the descendants of the first slaves from mainland Africa and Madagascar to Mauritius.

== Climate ==
Climate data for Agalega (1991–2020)
Month	Jan	Feb	Mar	Apr	May	Jun	Jul	Aug	Sep	Oct	Nov	Dec	Year
Record high °C (°F)	35.1 (95.2)	34.3 (93.7)	34.2 (93.6)	34.6 (94.3)	33.3 (91.9)	31.7 (89.1)	31.0 (87.8)	31.0 (87.8)	31.5 (88.7)	33.0 (91.4)	33.6 (92.5)	34.0 (93.2)	35.1 (95.2)
Mean daily maximum °C (°F)	31.4 (88.5)	31.3 (88.3)	31.7 (89.1)	31.6 (88.9)	30.7 (87.3)	29.5 (85.1)	28.8 (83.8)	28.9 (84.0)	29.5 (85.1)	30.2 (86.4)	30.9 (87.6)	31.5 (88.7)	30.5 (86.9)
Daily mean °C (°F)	27.8 (82.0)	27.7 (81.9)	28.0 (82.4)	28.0 (82.4)	27.6 (81.7)	26.4 (79.5)	25.6 (78.1)	25.6 (78.1)	26.0 (78.8)	26.7 (80.1)	27.3 (81.1)	27.7 (81.9)	27.0 (80.6)
Mean daily minimum °C (°F)	24.3 (75.7)	24.3 (75.7)	24.5 (76.1)	24.6 (76.3)	24.8 (76.6)	23.8 (74.8)	23.0 (73.4)	23.0 (73.4)	23.3 (73.9)	23.9 (75.0)	24.2 (75.6)	24.0 (75.2)	24.0 (75.2)
Record low °C (°F)	20.7 (69.3)	21.0 (69.8)	20.5 (68.9)	18.7 (65.7)	18.5 (65.3)	18.9 (66.0)	18.4 (65.1)	16.9 (62.4)	16.8 (62.2)	17.9 (64.2)	17.2 (63.0)	18.0 (64.4)	16.8 (62.2)
Average precipitation mm (inches)	273.2 (10.76)	255.8 (10.07)	192.7 (7.59)	174.2 (6.86)	118.3 (4.66)	106.1 (4.18)	102.4 (4.03)	62.1 (2.44)	56.3 (2.22)	95.3 (3.75)	109.7 (4.32)	225.8 (8.89)	1,771.8 (69.76)
Average precipitation days (≥ 1.0 mm)	17.4	15.7	15.3	13.5	12.2	12.3	13.7	11.4	9.1	10.5	11.4	14.0	156.5
Mean monthly sunshine hours	210.2	192.8	225.9	243.4	245.9	216.3	227.6	250.4	240.0	245.0	249.2	246.1	2,792.7
Source: NOAA
