= Agaléga =

Dependency of Mauritius

- Location of the Agalega Islands in the Indian Ocean.

Geography
- Location: Indian Ocean
- Coordinates: 10°24′54″S 56°38′06″E
- Total islands: 2
- Area: 24 km^{2} (9.3 sq mi)

Administration
- Mauritius
- Dependency: Agaléga
- Largest settlement: Vingt-Cinq

Demographics
- Population: 330 (2022)
- Ethnic groups: Creole

Agaléga (French: îles Agaléga) is a dependency of Mauritius, as defined by the Constitution of Mauritius, which consists of two outer islands located in the Indian Ocean, about 1,050 km (650 mi) north of Mauritius Island.

Similar to other Mauritian islands such as St. Brandon, Agaléga is run directly by the Prime Minister of Mauritius through the Prime Minister's Office to the Outer Island Development Corporation (OIDC). The population of the islands rose from 289 in 2011 to 330 in 2022.

The islands have a total area of 2,600 ha (6,400 acres). The North island is 12.5 km (7.8 mi) long and 1.5 km (0.9 mi) wide, while the South island is 7 km (4.3 mi) long and 4.5 km (2.8 mi) wide. The North Island is home to the islands' airstrip and the capital Vingt-Cinq. The islands are known for their production of coconuts, their main industry and, also, for the Agalega day gecko.

== Etymology ==
There are three different explanations for the name Agaléga.

1. One hypothesis is that the Portuguese explorer, Dom Pedro Mascarenhas, named Agaléga and the island of Sainte Marie (off the east coast of Madagascar) in honour of his two sailboats, the "Galega" and the "Santa Maria" in 1512, when he discovered Mauritius and Réunion Island.
2. Another, more probable explanation relates to the Galician explorer João da Nova, who discovered the islands in 1501 while working for the Portuguese. João was popularly known by his sailors as João Galego, according to Jean-Baptiste Benoît Eyriès' Les Nouvelles Annales de Voyage (Volume 38, page 88). Galego is the Galician/Portuguese word for someone from Galicia, North West Spain, and "Agalega", is derived from the feminine version of this (a is the feminine article in Galician/Portuguese, and Galician illa for "island" is feminine, so a [ilha] galega would mean "the Galician [Island]"). or simply "from Galicia".
3. A further, less likely, idea comes from a story in Sir Robert Scott's book Limuria: The Lesser Dependencies of Mauritius, where he describes the 1509 discovery of the Islands by the Portuguese mariner Diogo Lopes de Sequeira. According to this version, Diogo named the Islands Baixas da Gale, with the "da Gale" referring to putative gale-force winds hypothetically modelling the coasts of both islands. Scott suggests that maps of the region represented the islands initially as Gale, metamorphosing into Galera, Galega and finally Agalega.

Agale 1519 Atlas Miller, Pedro Reiner [1]https://gallica.bnf.fr/ark:/12148/btv1b55002605w/f2.item#

Gale 1519 Carte du Monde Jorge Reinel, Sevilla [2]https://gallica.bnf.fr/ark:/12148/btv1b59055673/f1.item

Y. de la Gale 1525 Planisfero Castiglioni: Carta del navigare universalissima et dil. gentilissima, Sevilla [3]https://edl.beniculturali.it/beu/850013656

Y. de la Galera 1548 Africa Nova tabula Gioan. Gastaldi, Giacomo; Pietro Andrea, Pb. Baptista Pedrezano Venecia [4]https://www.davidrumsey.com/luna/servlet/detail/RUMSEY~8~1~291327~90063055

Y. de la galera 1570 Ortelius, Abraham, 1527-1598 Africae Tabula Nova.Pb. Gielis Coppens van Diest; Anberes [5]

Agalega 1587 Tavola XVI. Che Ha Sua Superiore La Tavola Settima. Libro Terzo. Monte (Monti), Urbano, 1544-1613 Manuscript [6]

Da Galega 1595 Indian Ocean. Delineatio Orarum maritimarum, Terra vulgo indigetata Terra do Naral, item Sofale, Mozambicae ....Linschoten, Jan Huygen van, 1563-1611Paludanus, Bernard, 1550-1633 Chez Evert Pb. Cloppenburgh, Amsterdam [7]

Y. de la Galera 1599 Africa Nuova tavola, Ruscelli, Girolamo; Rosaccio, Giuseppe; Appresso gli heredi di Melchior Sessa; Venecia [8]

I. du Gallega: 1607 "Abissinorum Sive Pretiosi Ioannis Imperiu" Cornelis Claes, Amsterdam [9]

I. d. Gale 1665 Blaeu, Joan, 1596-1673 Africae nova descriptio Pb Joan Blaeu, Amsterdam [10]

== History ==
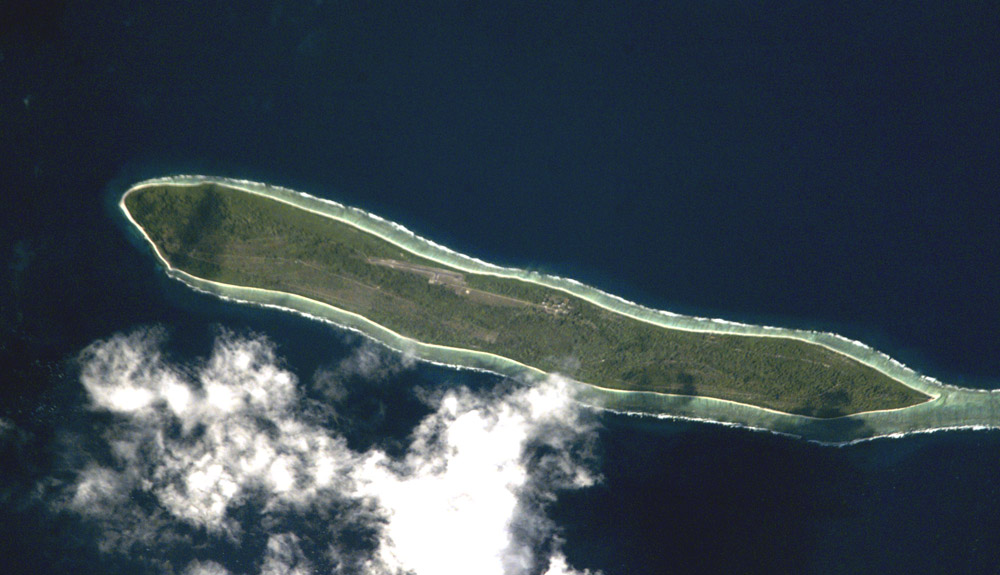
Satellite image of Agalega North

As with the Mascarene Islands, these islands may have been known to Arab and Malay sailors, although no written records have been found to confirm this. Agalega, or Galega, was examined by Captain Briggs of HMS Clorinde, on 12 January 1811, who seems to have fixed its location accurately, which was previously not the case. The landing was found to be difficult on account of the heavy surf, the island being surrounded by a reef. A former French privateer was, at this time, settled on the island, having under him a colony of negroes, who cultivated part of the land with maize and wheat.

The first settlement on the islands was founded by M. de Rosemond. Upon his arrival in August 1808, he discovered the bodies of two castaways and a bottle containing notes written by one of them, the privateer Robert Dufour. The only hill on the islands, Montagne d'Emmerez, derives its name from the second shipwrecked sailor, a Mauritian called Adelaide d'Emmerez.

Economic, infrastructural and political development of the islands did not begin until the arrival of Auguste Le Duc in 1827, a French administrator sent by M. Barbé to organise production of coconut oil and copra. There still exists a number of historical monuments dating from the period 1827 to 1846, made by slaves: the village Vingt-Cinq (named after the 25 lashes that were given to rebellious slaves), the Slave Dungeons, an Oil Mill, a cemetery for Blacks and a cemetery for Whites, among others. Auguste Le Duc also began construction of a bridge between the two islands, although it was swept away by severe weather.

Father Victor Malaval brought the Catholic Church to the islands in 1897 as the first missionary. An improvised chapel was built on the South Island.

The origin of its inhabitants was influenced by the political ructions in the world at the time: Mauritius became a British colony in 1810, the abolition of the slave trade, then the abolition of slavery in 1835, followed by the arrival of unskilled Asian labourers. The slaves themselves were of Malagasy origin or from Madras in India whilst some were freed from slave ships and others were from the slave trading ports of the Comoros Islands.

Legends such as "Calèche Blanc" and "Princesse Malgache" are part of the folklore of the islands, as well as the coded language of "Madam langaz Seret" which has come down from the time of slavery. This language is a mixture of French and Mauritian Creole where every syllable is doubled with the first consonants replaced by the "g" (e.g. "Français" becomes "frangrançaisgais"). The origin, purpose and reasons for the evolution of this specific language remains unclear.

Today, the population consists of around 300 people, known locally as Agaléens ("Agalegans"), who speak Creole. Catholicism is the dominant religion.

A 2015 memorandum of understanding on India–Mauritius military cooperation envisaged developing the Agaléga islands for an Indian military base. Local residents vocally opposed construction of the base as being a threat to local employment, self-determination, creole language (Agalega creole) and culture and Mauritian sovereignty. These recent infrastructural developments by India, for civil and military use, have significantly transformed the islands' landscape.

On 11 December 2024, Cyclone Chido made landfall near North Island, destroying most of the island's homes and leaving Agaléga without power.

== Geography ==
North Island is 12.5 km (7.8 mi) long and 1.5 km (0.9 mi) wide while South Island is 7 km (4.3 mi) long and 4.5 km (2.8 mi) wide. The total area of both islands is 26 km^{2} (10 sq mi). The soil is likely coral. The culmination is at the top of the hill Emmer on the island in the north. The climate is hot and humid and the average annual temperature is 26 °C (79 °F), ranging from a minimum of 22.5 °C (72.5 °F) and a maximum of 30.6 °C (87.1 °F). April is the hottest month of the year. The tropical climate is conducive to the development of mangrove and coconut trees that cover the two islets.

=== Climate ===
Climate data for Agalega (1991–2020)
Month	Jan	Feb	Mar	Apr	May	Jun	Jul	Aug	Sep	Oct	Nov	Dec	Year
Record high °C (°F)	35.1 (95.2)	34.3 (93.7)	34.2 (93.6)	34.6 (94.3)	33.3 (91.9)	31.7 (89.1)	31.0 (87.8)	31.0 (87.8)	31.5 (88.7)	33.0 (91.4)	33.6 (92.5)	34.0 (93.2)	35.1 (95.2)
Mean daily maximum °C (°F)	31.4 (88.5)	31.3 (88.3)	31.7 (89.1)	31.6 (88.9)	30.7 (87.3)	29.5 (85.1)	28.8 (83.8)	28.9 (84.0)	29.5 (85.1)	30.2 (86.4)	30.9 (87.6)	31.5 (88.7)	30.5 (86.9)
Daily mean °C (°F)	27.8 (82.0)	27.7 (81.9)	28.0 (82.4)	28.0 (82.4)	27.6 (81.7)	26.4 (79.5)	25.6 (78.1)	25.6 (78.1)	26.0 (78.8)	26.7 (80.1)	27.3 (81.1)	27.7 (81.9)	27.0 (80.6)
Mean daily minimum °C (°F)	24.3 (75.7)	24.3 (75.7)	24.5 (76.1)	24.6 (76.3)	24.8 (76.6)	23.8 (74.8)	23.0 (73.4)	23.0 (73.4)	23.3 (73.9)	23.9 (75.0)	24.2 (75.6)	24.0 (75.2)	24.0 (75.2)
Record low °C (°F)	20.7 (69.3)	21.0 (69.8)	20.5 (68.9)	18.7 (65.7)	18.5 (65.3)	18.9 (66.0)	18.4 (65.1)	16.9 (62.4)	16.8 (62.2)	17.9 (64.2)	17.2 (63.0)	18.0 (64.4)	16.8 (62.2)
Average precipitation mm (inches)	273.2 (10.76)	255.8 (10.07)	192.7 (7.59)	174.2 (6.86)	118.3 (4.66)	106.1 (4.18)	102.4 (4.03)	62.1 (2.44)	56.3 (2.22)	95.3 (3.75)	109.7 (4.32)	225.8 (8.89)	1,771.8 (69.76)
Average precipitation days (≥ 1.0 mm)	17.4	15.7	15.3	13.5	12.2	12.3	13.7	11.4	9.1	10.5	11.4	14.0	156.5
Mean monthly sunshine hours	210.2	192.8	225.9	243.4	245.9	216.3	227.6	250.4	240.0	245.0	249.2	246.1	2,792.7
Source: NOAA

== Economy ==
Agaléga is managed by a company of the State of Mauritius, the Outer Island Development Company (OIDC). The company delegates a resident manager, a kind of steward, who is the supreme authority on the two islets. The economy of the archipelago is based primarily on the exportation of coconut oil.

== Detachment of Agalega from British Mauritius ==
In the 1960s, the United Kingdom and the United States discussed separating Agalega from British Mauritius in a similar manner to the Chagos Archipelago, but this was rejected on grounds of cost, political sensitivity, lack of immediate need, and poor anchorage. In the Chagos' case, the financial costs in 1965 were estimated at £10 million (approximately £250 million today) excluding the United States' secret contribution to the BIOT enterprise via the waiving of costs associated with Britain's nuclear weapons acquisitions. The financial costs for Britain to create BIOT were high. Acquiring Agaléga would have increased Britain's financial burden, at a time when it was winding down its vast empire and reining in its defense spending.

== Infrastructure ==
Most homes are in the main villages of Vingt-Cinq and La Fourche on the North Island, and St. Rita on the South Island. The road connecting the different localities is sandy and coral. The North Island is home to an airstrip, a government primary school "Jacques Le Chartier", the police station, the weather station, the central telecommunications office (Mauritius Telecom) and the health service. There is no running water on the island. Drinking water comes from rainwater collected by gutters. Water for other uses is sourced from wells. Electricity is supplied by generators running on diesel, with supply limited to certain hours. The company that manages the remote islands, such as Agaléga and St Brandon, is working on a project to ensure power supply to these islands, via submarine connection.

Agaléga is connected to Mauritius by air and sea. The civilian airstrip on the island in the north allows takeoff and landing of small aircraft. A 10,000 foot long airstrip was built to accommodate naval surveillance aircraft. There is no functional port on the islands, only a pier at St James Anchorage on the island's north. Vessels of the Mauritius Shipping Corporation (the Pride Mauritius and the Mauritius Trochetia) cast anchor about 500 m (1,600 ft) from this place, in the deep sea, during refueling.

Health services are provided by a health officer and a midwife. Doctors from Mauritius make short tours throughout the year. The Agaléens also receive a visit from a magistrate during the year.

For education, there is a primary school for the young, but pupils then continue their education in secondary schools on the island of Mauritius.
