= List of named storms (V) =

Storms are named for historical reasons to avoid confusion when communicating with the public, as more than one storm can exist at a time. Names are drawn in order from predetermined lists. For tropical cyclones, names are assigned when a system has one-, three-, or ten-minute winds of more than 65 km/h (40 mph). Standards, however, vary from basin to basin. For example, some tropical depressions are named in the Western Pacific, while within the Australian and Southern Pacific regions, the naming of tropical cyclones are delayed until they have gale-force winds occurring more than halfway around the storm center.

This list covers the letter V.

== Storms ==
Note: † indicates the name was retired after that usage in the respective basin

- Vae (1952) – Category 1 typhoon, struck Vietnam then crossed over to the North Indian Ocean before dissipating.
- Vaianu

- 2006 – a Category 3 severe tropical cyclone, caused minor damage in Tonga.
- 2026† – a Category 3 severe tropical cyclone that made landfall in the New Zealand as subtropical cyclone.

- Val

- 1975 – Category 4 tropical cyclone, meandered near Fiji and Wallis and Futuna.
- 1980 – passed over Wallis and Futuna.
- 1982 – short-lived storm east of Taiwan; also known as Deling within the Philippine Area of Responsibility (PAR), and also considered a continuation of Tess by the Japan Meteorological Agency (JMA).
- 1985 – passed south of Taiwan, dissipated approaching Guangdong; also known as Narsing within the PAR.
- 1988 – late season storm, dissipated northeast of the Philippines; also known as Apiang within the PAR.
- 1991† – Category 4 tropical cyclone, caused over US$250 million in damage in Samoa and American Samoa.
- 1992 – remained east of Japan.
- 1995 – took erratic track southeast of Japan before dissipating northeast of the Philippines.

- Valerie (1962) – Category 1 hurricane, struck western Mexico.
- Vamco

- 2003 – hit Zhejiang in eastern China; also known as Manang within the PAR.
- 2009 – Category 4-equivalent typhoon, churned in the open ocean.
- 2015 – affected Indochina, killing 15 people.
- 2020† – powerful and deadly Category 4-equivalent Typhoon, made landfall on Luzon and in Vietnam; also known as Ulysses within the PAR.

- Vamei (2001)† – formed at about 85 nmi (100 mi; 160 km) from the equator, closer than any other tropical cyclone on record, struck Peninsular Malaysia and Sumatra.
- Vanessa

- 1976 – Category 3 tropical cyclone, meandered off the northwest coast of Australia
- 1981 – remained well east of Japan
- 1984 – Category 5 super typhoon, killed 64 people in the Philippines, despite remaining well east of the country; also known as Toyang within the PAR
- 1988 – moved across the Philippines then struck southeastern China; also known as Edeng within the PAR
- 1991 – moved across the Philippines then dissipated in the South China Sea; also known as Bebeng within the PAR
- 1994 – short-lived storm, absorbed by the larger Typhoon Tim off the west coast of Luzon; also known as Loleng within the PAR

- Vance

- 1990 – Category 2 hurricane, made a clockwise loop looped off the southwest coast of Mexico.
- 1999† – Category 4 tropical cyclone, caused severe damage across the western coast of Australia.
- 2014 – Category 2 hurricane, weakened as it curved back toward the coast of Mexico.
- 2026 – a Category 3 hurricane that caused no damage or casualties.

- Vania

- 1994 – a Category 2 tropical cyclone that affected Vanuatu and New Caledonia.
- 2011† – a Category 2 tropical cyclone that affected Fiji, Vanuatu, New Caledonia, Norfolk Island and New Zealand.

- Vardah (2016) – struck the Andaman and Nicobar Islands along with South India.
- Vaughn (2000) – Category 2 tropical cyclone, dissipated as it approached the coast of Queensland.
- Vayu (2019) – Category 3-equivalent tropical cyclone, struck the Saurashtra Peninsula of northwestern India.
- Veena (1983)† – Category 3-equivalent tropical cyclone, moved through French Polynesia.
- Veli

- 1987 – a Category 1 tropical cyclone that affected Vanuatu; interacted with and absorbed Cyclone Uma
- 1998† – Category 2 tropical cyclone, caused minor damaging surf on the islands of French Polynesia

- Velma (1983) – short-lived tropical storm off the southwestern coast of Mexico.
- Vera

- 1951 – tropical storm, remained east of Japan.
- 1956 – Category 1 typhoon, struck the Philippines, Hainan, and Vietnam.
- 1959 – deadly Category 5 super typhoon, struck Japan, killing around 5,000 people.
- 1962 – Category 1-equivalent typhoon, passed northwest of Okinawa before making landfall near Kagoshima.
- 1965 – short-lived tropical storm that struck the eastern Philippines; also known as Daling within the PAR.
- 1967 – tropical storm, remained east of Japan.
- 1971 – minimal typhoon, remained away from land; also known as Karing within the PAR.
- 1973 – moved across southern Philippines; also known as Openg within the PAR.
- 1974 – developed east of Australia and progressed southeastward.
- 1977 – Category 3 typhoon, rapidly intensified prior to striking Taiwan and eastern China; also known as Huling within the PAR.
- 1979 – Category 5 super typhoon, weakened before hitting Luzon; also known as Yayang within the PAR.
- 1983 – Category 2 typhoon, crossed the Philippines and Hainan, killing 127 people; also known as Bebeng within the PAR.
- 1986 – Category 3 typhoon, took an erratic track before hitting South Korea, killing 25 people; also known as Loleng within the PAR.
- 1989 – struck Zhejiang in eastern China, killing 500 people; also known as Pining within the PAR.

- Verbena (2025) – a fairly strong and erratic tropical cyclone that impacted much of the Visayas and portions of Luzon and Mindanao in the Philippines.
- Vern (1978) – Category 2 tropical cyclone, hit Western Australia.
- Verna

- 1945 – a strong tropical storm, moved across Hainan island.
- 1977 – a Category 3 severe tropical cyclone that made landfall near Bowen, Queensland.

- Verne

- 1991 – passed north of Guam.
- 1994 – Category 4 typhoon, passed near Guam, stalled as it approached the Philippines, then moved out to sea; also known as Delang in the PAR.

- Vernon

- 1980 – Category 3 typhoon, remained east of Japan.
- 1984 – caused flooding in Vietnam.
- 1986 – developed and dissipated northeast of Australia.
- 1987 – passed northeast of Luzon and later struck Taiwan; also known as Diding in the PAR.
- 1990 – Category 2 typhoon, remained east of Japan.
- 1993 – Category 1 typhoon, paralleled the east coast of Japan.
- 2022 – Category 3 tropical cyclone, remained over the open Indian Ocean.

- Veronica (2019)† – Category 5 severe tropical cyclone, hit Western Australia causing about A$1.7 billion (US$1.2 billion) in economic losses
- Vicente

- 2005 – caused severe flooding in Vietnam and Thailand.
- 2012† – Category 4 typhoon, struck the Chinese province of Guangdong; also known as Ferdie within the PAR.
- 2018 – small tropical storm, made landfall in the Mexican State of Michoacán.

- Vicki (1998) – Category 2 typhoon hit Luzon and Japan, killing 108 people, mostly related to the sinking of the MV Princess of the Orient; also known as Gading within the PAR.
- Vicky

- 1972 – Category 2 tropical cyclone, crossed Western Australia coast at Cockatoo Island.
- 2001 – short-lived storm, remained over the open South Pacific Ocean.
- February 2020 – short-lived storm, tracked near Samoa then passed just south of Tutuila in American Samoa.
- September 2020 – storm churned in the eastern Atlantic Ocean.
- December 2020 – caused deadly flooding in the Philippines; also known as Krovanh beyond the PAR.

- Victor

- 1986 – Category 3 tropical cyclone, parallelled the coast of Western Australia.
- 1997 – killed 655 people when it struck the Chinese province of Guangdong; also known as Goring within the PAR.
- 1998 – formed from the remnants of Cyclone Katrina, moved through the Northern Territory and into the Indian Ocean, becoming a Category 2 tropical cyclone; renamed Cindy upon entering the South-West Indian Ocean.
- 2016 – Category 2 tropical cyclone, formed east of Pago Pago, American Samoa.
- 2021 – large tropical storm, formed south of Cabo Verde and moved over the open Atlantic Ocean.

- Victoria

- 1965 – developed off the southwest coast of Mexico.
- 2013 – Category 3 severe tropical cyclone on the Australian Scale, remained well west of Australia.

- Vida (1975) – Category 2 tropical cyclone, paralleled the coast of Western Australia, buffeted the Perth metropolitan region area with high winds.
- Vince

- 2005 – Category 1 hurricane, formed southeast of the Azores and made landfall on the Iberian Peninsula as a tropical depression
- 2011 – poorly organized storm, formed and dissipated northwest of Western Australia
- 2025 – a Category 4 tropical cyclone, churned in the open ocean.

- Vincent

- 1990 – a Category 3 severe tropical cyclone paralleled the coast of Western Australia.
- 2001 – made landfall in Western Australia as a tropical low.

- Vinta

- 2009 – Category 5 super typhoon, the most intense tropical cyclone worldwide in 2009, remained over the open Pacific Ocean; also known as Nida beyond the PAR.
- 2013 – Category 3 typhoon, struck Luzon and affected Vietnam; also known as Krosa beyond the PAR.
- 2017† – Category 2 typhoon, struck Mindanao killing 266 people; also known as Tembin beyond the PAR.

- Viola

- 1953 – Category 3 typhoon, passed south of Taiwan.
- 1958 – Category 3 typhoon, brushed Guam and remained east of Japan.
- 1961 – short-lived storm near southern Vietnam.
- 1964 – Category 1-equivalent typhoon, struck near Hong Kong; also known as Konsing within the PAR.
- 1966 – severe tropical storm, caused minor damage in Japan.
- 1969 – Category 4 typhoon, caused 1,000 deaths in Guangdong, China; also known as Elang within the PAR.
- 1972 – classified as a tropical storm by the JTWC, stayed far east of Japan; also known as Esang within the PAR.
- 1975 – short-lived storm northeast of the Philippines; also known as Gening within the PAR.
- 1978 – Category 4 typhoon that tracked northeast of the Philippines; also known as Esang within the PAR.
- 1979 – Category 5 severe tropical cyclone on the Australian scale; renamed Claudette after crossing into the South-West Indian Ocean.

- Violet

- 1955 – Category 1 typhoon, struck Mindanao in the Philippines.
- 1959 – short-lived tropical depression near southeastern Vietnam.
- 1961 – Category 5 super typhoon, clipped the Boso Peninsula of Japan.
- 1964 – Category 1-equivalent typhoon, struck central Vietnam.
- 1967 – Category 4-equivalent typhoon, hit northeastern Luzon; also known as Karing within the PAR.
- 1970 – crossed Luzon in the Philippine island of Luzon and then made landfall in Guangdong, China; also known as Heling within the PAR.
- 1972 – severe tropical storm, remained over the open Pacific Ocean.
- 1976 – tropical storm that killed two people when it struck Hainan and Guangdong in China; also known as Lusing within the PAR.
- 1995† – Category 2 tropical cyclone that paralleled Australia's east.
- 1996 – Category 4 super typhoon, brushed southeastern Japan; also known as Osang within the PAR.

- Violeta (2004)† – traversed the Philippines as a tropical depression, killed 31 people; also known as Merbok beyond the PAR.
- Vipa (2001) – Category 1 typhoon, passed southeast of Japan.
- Virgil

- 1992 – Category 4 hurricane, weakened before landfall in the Mexican state of Colima.
- 1999 – severe tropical storm southeast of Japan.

- Virginia

- 1957 – Category 5 typhoon, killed 86 people and caused extensive damage in Taiwan and southern Japan.
- 1969 – Category 2 typhoon, killed 2 people when it hit Shikoku and Honshu in Japan.
- 1963 – moderate tropical storm that remained out to sea; also known as Etang within the PAR.
- 1965 – minimal Category 1 typhoon, approached Japan before curving back out to sea.
- 1968 – became a severe tropical storm just west of the International Date Line and shortly thereafter crossed into the Central Pacific Ocean.
- 1971 – strong Category 4 typhoon, killed 56 people died in Japan due to numerous landslides.
- 1974 – Category 1-equivalent typhoon, never affected land.
- 1978 – Category 1-equivalent typhoon, brushed eastern Japan.

- Viring (2003) – Category 1 typhoon, struck northeastern Luzon, killing four people, then passed just east of Taiwan; also known as Melor beyond the PAR.
- Vivian (1985) – short-lived tropical storm far to the southwest of the Baja California peninsula.
- Vivienne

- 1971† – South Pacific tropical cyclone.
- 1984 – developed southwest of Indonesia; renamed Fanja after crossing into the South-West Indian Ocean.
- 2005 – short-lived storm off the northwest coast of Western Australia.

- Viyaru (2013) – brought heavy rains to parts of Indonesia, Sri Lanka, India, Bangladesh, Myanmar and Thailand, killing 107 people; known operationally as Mahasen.
- Vongfong

- 2002 – tropical storm that struck the Chinese province of Guangdong, killing 41 people.
- 2008 – tropical storm that passed east of Japan.
- 2014 – Category 5 super typhoon that struck Japan; also known as Ompong within the PAR.
- 2020† – Category 3 typhoon that hit the Philippines, causing over ₱1 billion damage; also known as Ambo within the PAR.

== See also ==
- Tropical cyclone naming
- List of historical tropical cyclone names
