= List of storms named Viola =

The name Viola has been used for nine tropical cyclones in the Western Pacific Ocean and one in the Australian region of the Indian Ocean.

In the Western Pacific:

- Typhoon Viola (1953), a category 3 typhoon
- Typhoon Viola (1958)
- Tropical Depression Viola (1961)
- Typhoon Viola (1964) (Konsing), made landfall near Hong Kong as a tropical storm
- Typhoon Viola (1966), caused minor damage in Japan
- Typhoon Viola (1969) (Elang), a category 4 typhoon which caused 1000 deaths in and around Shantou, Guangdong, China.
- Typhoon Viola (1972) (Esang)
- Tropical Storm Viola (1975) (Gening)
- Typhoon Viola (1978) (Esang)

In the Australian region:

- Cyclone Viola (1979), a category 5 severe tropical cyclone; renamed Claudette after crossing into the South-West Indian Ocean
