= List of storms named Vaianu =

The name Vaianu has been used for two tropical cyclones in the South Pacific Ocean:

- Cyclone Vaianu (2006) – a Category 3 severe tropical cyclone passed between Fiji and Tonga.
- Cyclone Vaianu – a Category 3 severe tropical cyclone that made landfall in the New Zealand as subtropical cyclone.

After the 2025-26 season, the name Vaianu was retired and was replaced by Velma.
