= List of storms named Vicky =

The name Vicky or Vicki has been used for six tropical cyclones worldwide: one in the Atlantic Ocean, two in the Western Pacific Ocean, one in the Australian region, and two in the Southern Pacific Ocean.

In the Atlantic:

- Tropical Storm Vicky (2020), churned in the open eastern Atlantic

In the Western Pacific:

- Typhoon Vicki (1998) (T9807, 11W, Gading), affected the Philippines and made landfall in southern Japan

For PAGASA, it replaced the name Violeta following the 2004 Pacific typhoon season

- Tropical Storm Krovanh (2020) (T2023, 26W, Vicky), affected the Philippines, Malaysia, and Thailand

Preceded by Upang	Pacific typhoon season names Vicky	Succeeded by Warren

In the Australian region:

- Cyclone Vicky (1972), affected northwestern Australia

In the Southern Pacific:

- Cyclone Vicky (2001), never threatened land
- Cyclone Vicky (2020), brought heavy rainfall to the Samoan Islands
