= List of storms named Virginia =

The name Virginia has been used for eight tropical cyclones in the Western Pacific Ocean.

- Typhoon Virginia (1957) (T5705, 05W) – Category 5 typhoon, killed 86 people and caused extensive damage in Taiwan and southern Japan
- Typhoon Virginia (1960) (T6011, 27W) – Category 2 typhoon, killed 2 people when it hit Shikoku and Honshu in Japan
- Tropical Storm Virginia (1963) (T6306, 15W, Etang) – moderate tropical storm that remained out to sea
- Typhoon Virginia (1965) (T6525, 31W) – minimal Category 1 typhoon, approached Japan before curving back out to sea
- Tropical Storm Virginia (1968) (T6811, 15W) – became a severe tropical storm just west of the International Date Line and shortly thereafter crossed into the Central Pacific basin
- Typhoon Virginia (1971) (T7125, 26W) – strong Category 4 typhoon, killed 56 people died in Japan due to numerous landslides
- Typhoon Virginia (1974) (T7420, 24W) – Category 1-equivalent typhoon, never affected land.
- Typhoon Virginia (1978) (T7807, 07W) – Category 1-equivalent typhoon, brushed eastern Japan
