= List of storms named Vera =

The name Vera has been used for thirteen tropical cyclones in the northwest Pacific Ocean.

- Tropical Storm Vera (1951) (T5118)
- Typhoon Vera (1956) (T5605)
- Typhoon Vera (1959) (T5915, 39W) – Hit Japan and over 5,000 were killed.
- Typhoon Vera (1962) (T6215, 60W) – Hit Japan.
- Tropical Storm Vera (1965) (T6504, 05W, Daling)
- Tropical Storm Vera (1967) (T6726, 30W)
- Typhoon Vera (1971) (T7103, 03W, Karing)
- Tropical Storm Vera (1973) (T7321, 23W, Openg)
- Typhoon Vera (1977) (T7705, 07W, Huling)
- Typhoon Vera (1979) (T7921, 24W, Yayang)
- Typhoon Vera (1983) (T8303, 03W, Bebeng)
- Typhoon Vera (1986) (T8613, 11W, Loleng)
- Tropical Storm Vera (1989) (T8921, 24W, Pining)

The name Vera has also been used for one tropical cyclone in the southwestern Pacific Ocean.

- Cyclone Vera (1974)
