= List of storms named Victor =

The name Victor has been used for five tropical cyclones worldwide.

In the Atlantic:

- Tropical Storm Victor (2021), large tropical storm that formed at an unusually low latitude of 8.3°N, and stayed at sea.

In the Western Pacific:

- Tropical Storm Victor (1997) (T9712, 13W, Goring), caused severe damage in China.

In the Australian region:

- Cyclone Victor (1986), considered the most severe cyclone of the season.
- Cyclone Victor (1998), crossed into the Indian Ocean and was renamed Cindy.

In the South Pacific:

- Cyclone Victor (2016), did not affect land.
