= List of storms named Vanessa =

The name Vanessa has been used to name six tropical cyclones worldwide: five in the Western Pacific Ocean and one in the Australian region of the Indian Ocean.

In the Australian region:

- Severe Tropical Cyclone Vanessa (1976) – Category 3 tropical cyclone, meandered off the northwest coast of Australia

In the Western Pacific:

- Tropical Storm Vanessa (1981) (T8116, 20W) – remained well east of Japan
- Typhoon Vanessa (1984) (T8424, 25W, Toyang) – a Category 5 super typhoon that killed 64 people in the Philippines, despite remaining well east of the country
- Tropical Storm Vanessa (1988) (T8804, 05W, Edeng) – moved across the Philippines then struck southeastern China
- Tropical Storm Vanessa (1991) (T9103, 03W, Bebeng) – moved across the Philippines then dissipated in the South China Sea
- Tropical Storm Vanessa (1994) (T9406, 09W, Loleng) – short-lived storm that was absorbed by the larger Typhoon Tim off the west coast of Luzon
