= List of storms named Virgil =

The name Virgil has been used for two tropical cyclones worldwide.

In the Eastern Pacific:

- Hurricane Virgil (1992) – a late-season category 4 hurricane which struck southwestern Mexico, causing minimal damage.

In the Western Pacific:

- Typhoon Virgil (1999) (T9921, 19W) – never approached land.
