= List of storms named Vance =

The name Vance has been used for four tropical cyclones worldwide, three in the Eastern Pacific and once in the Australian Region of the South Pacific.

In the Eastern Pacific:

- Hurricane Vance (1990) – never approached land.
- Hurricane Vance (2014) – a Category 2 hurricane that affected Mexico
- Hurricane Vance (2026) – a Category 3 hurricane that caused no damage or casualties

In the Australian Region:

- Cyclone Vance (1999) – caused extensive damage in Western Australia
