= List of storms named Vania =

The name Vania has been used for two tropical cyclones in the South Pacific region of the Southern Hemisphere:

- Cyclone Vania (1994) – a Category 2 tropical cyclone that affected Vanuatu and New Caledonia.
- Cyclone Vania (2011) – a Category 2 tropical cyclone that affected Fiji, Vanuatu, New Caledonia, Norfolk Island and New Zealand.
