= List of storms named Verna =

The name Verna has been used for two tropical cyclones worldwide, one in the Western Pacific Ocean and one in the Australian Region.

In the Western Pacific:

- Tropical Storm Verna (1945) – a strong tropical storm, moved across Hainan island.

In the Australian region:

- Cyclone Verna (1977) – a Category 3 severe tropical cyclone that made landfall near Bowen, Queensland.
