= List of storms named Veli =

The name Veli has been used for two tropical cyclones in the South Pacific region of the Southern Hemisphere:

- Cyclone Veli (1987) – a Category 1 tropical cyclone that affected Vanuatu; interacted with and absorbed Cyclone Uma.
- Cyclone Veli (1998) – Category 2 tropical cyclone, caused minor damaging surf on the islands of French Polynesia
