= List of storms named Victoria =

The name Victoria has been used for two tropical cyclones worldwide, and was used unofficially for one European windstorm.

In the Eastern Pacific:

- Tropical Storm Victoria (1965) – moderate tropical storm that stayed at sea

In the Australian region:

- Cyclone Victoria (2013) – Category 3 severe tropical cyclone that also stayed at sea

In Europe:

- Storm Victoria (2020) – an unofficial name for Storm Dennis used mostly in German-speaking countries
