= List of storms named Violet =

Tropical Storm Violet may refer to:

- Typhoon Violet (1955) – Category 1 typhoon, struck Mindanao in the Philippines
- Tropical Depression Violet (1959) – short-lived tropical depression near southeastern Vietnam
- Typhoon Violet (1961) – Category 5 super typhoon, clipped the Boso Peninsula of Japan
- Typhoon Violet (1964) – Category 1-equivalent typhoon, struck central Vietnam
- Typhoon Violet (1967) – Category 4-equivalent typhoon, hit northeastern Luzon; also known as Karing within the PAR
- Tropical Storm Violet (1970) – crossed Luzon in the Philippine island of Luzon and then made landfall in Guangdong, China; also known as Heling within the PAR
- Tropical Storm Violet (1972) – severe tropical storm, remained over the open Pacific Ocean
- Tropical Storm Violet (1976) – tropical storm that killed two people when it struck Hainan and Guangdong in China; also known as Lusing within the PAR
- Cyclone Violet (1995) – Category 2 tropical cyclone that paralleled Australia's east
- Typhoon Violet (1996) – Category 4 super typhoon, brushed southeastern Japan; also known as Osang within the PAR
