= List of storms named Vincent =

The name Vincent has been used for two tropical cyclones in the Australian region of the Southern Hemisphere.

- Cyclone Vincent (1990) – a Category 3 severe tropical cyclone paralleled the coast of Western Australia.
- Cyclone Vincent (2001) – a Category 1 tropical cyclone that made landfall in Western Australia as a tropical low.
