= List of storms named Vivienne =

The name Vivienne has been used for two tropical cyclones in the Australian Region and one in the South Pacific Ocean.

- Cyclone Vivienne-Fanja (1984) – developed southwest of Indonesia; renamed Fanja after crossing into the South-West Indian Ocean.
- Cyclone Vivienne (2005) – short-lived storm off the northwest coast of Western Australia.

In the South Pacific Ocean:

- Cyclone Vivienne (1971) – south Pacific tropical cyclone.
