= List of storms named Val =

The name Val has been used for eight tropical cyclones worldwide: five in the Western North Pacific and three in the South Pacific basins.

In the Western Pacific:

- Tropical Storm Val (1982) (T8206, 06W, Deling) – short-lived storm east of Taiwan.
- Tropical Storm Val (1985) (T8517, 16W, Narsing) – passed south of Taiwan, dissipated approaching Guangdong.
- Tropical Storm Val (1988) (T8831, 53W, Apiang) – late season storm, dissipated northeast of the Philippines.
- Tropical Storm Val (1992) (T9220, 20W)– remained east of Japan.
- Tropical Storm Val (1995) (T9517, 25W) – took erratic track southeast of Japan before dissipating northeast of the Philippines.

In the South Pacific:

- Cyclone Val (1975) – Category 4 tropical cyclone, meandered near Fiji and Wallis and Futuna.
- Cyclone Val (1980) – passed over Wallis and Futuna.
- Cyclone Val (1991) – Category 4 tropical cyclone, caused over US$250 million in damage in Samoa and American Samoa.

The WMO retired the name Val from use in the South Pacific basin following the 1991–92 cyclone season.
