= Typhoon Vera (1983) =

Pacific typhoon in 1983

Typhoon Vera (Bebeng)
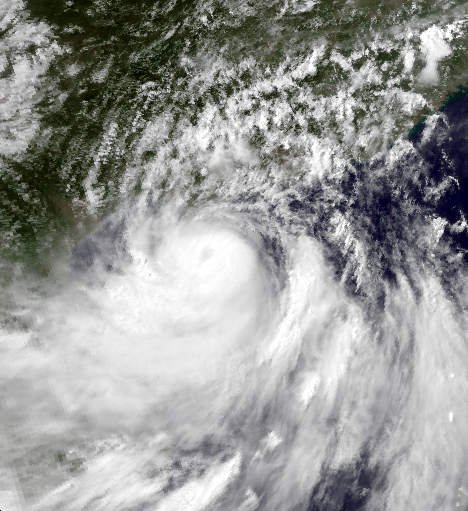
- Vera near peak intensity

Meteorological history
- Formed: July 10, 1983
- Dissipated: July 19, 1983

Typhoon
- 10-minute sustained (JMA)
- Highest winds: 140 km/h (85 mph)
- Lowest pressure: 965 hPa (mbar); 28.50 inHg

Category 2-equivalent typhoon
- 1-minute sustained (SSHWS/JTWC)
- Highest winds: 165 km/h (105 mph)

Overall effects
- Fatalities: 127
- Missing: 60
- Damage: $42 million (1983 USD)
- Areas affected: Philippines, China, Vietnam, Cambodia
- IBTrACS
- Part of the 1983 Pacific typhoon season

Typhoon Vera, known in the Philippines as Typhoon Bebeng, brought significant flooding to the Philippines in July 1983. The monsoon trough spawned a tropical depression on July 12 east of the Philippines. Although the depression was initially slow to organize, the system headed west-northwestward, strengthening to a tropical storm the following day and a typhoon on the July 14. Vera moved onshore early the next day as a minimal typhoon in the Philippines before weakening slightly over the islands. However, Vera managed to restrengthen over the South China Sea while accelerating, later attaining winds of 85 mph (135 km/h). After crossing Hainan while still at peak intensity and moving into the northern portion of the Gulf of Tonkin, Vera gradually weakened before moving ashore in northern Vietnam on July 18. By July 19, Vera had dissipated inland.

Across the Philippines, Typhoon Vera killed 123 and left 60 missing and 45 hurt. Approximately 200,000 people were homeless. The typhoon destroyed 29,054 dwellings and "badly" damaged 5,558 others. A total of 76,346 homes were "partially" damaged. Moreover, 24,280 people sought shelter due to Vera. Around 80% of Manila's residents lost power. Many low-lying areas of Manila were underwater while strong winds damaged homes and trees. The province of Bataan sustained the worst damage from the storm and 10 nearby villages were destroyed. Throughout the province, 50 people perished, primarily due to drownings. In all, damage totaled $42 million (1983 USD). In addition to the impact on the Philippines, Typhoon Vera claimed three lives in Vietnam and damaged 2,500 houses. Offshore China, a swimmer drowned due to rough seas caused by Vera.

== Meteorological history ==
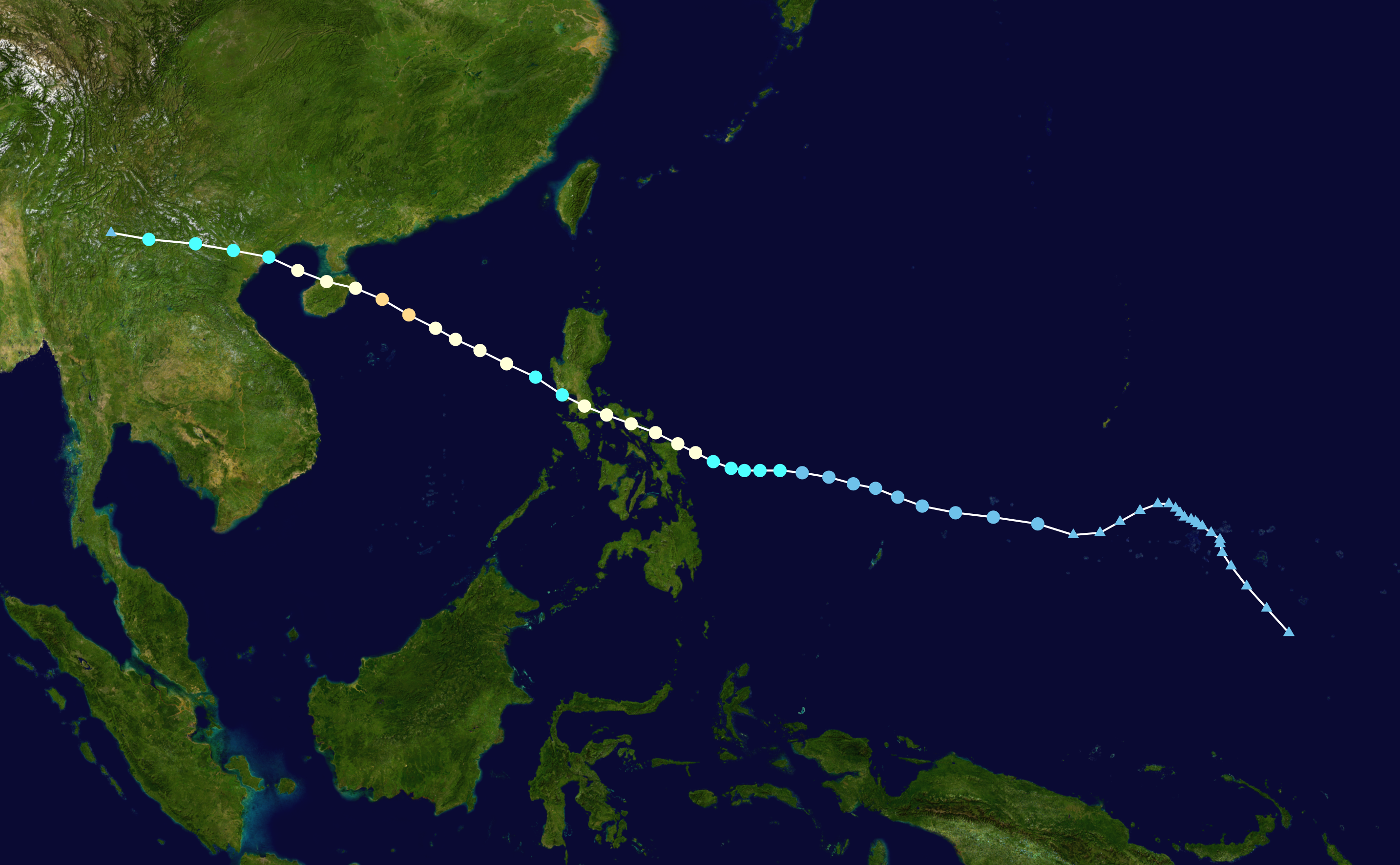
Map plotting the storm's track and intensity, according to the Saffir–Simpson scale Map key Saffir–Simpson scale Tropical depression (≤38 mph, ≤62 km/h) Tropical storm (39–73 mph, 63–118 km/h) Category 1 (74–95 mph, 119–153 km/h) Category 2 (96–110 mph, 154–177 km/h) Category 3 (111–129 mph, 178–208 km/h) Category 4 (130–156 mph, 209–251 km/h) Category 5 (≥157 mph, ≥252 km/h) Unknown Storm type Tropical cyclone Subtropical cyclone Extratropical cyclone, remnant low, tropical disturbance, or monsoon depression

The origins of Typhoon Vera can be traced back to a poorly organized monsoon trough that extended westward from the Philippines to the 160th meridian east in early July 1983. On July 4, the storm developed a persistent circulation. Four days later, a pair of organized areas of convection began to form, one near the 120th meridian east and another close to Guam. A Tropical Cyclone Formation Alert (TCFA) was issued at 0600 UTC on July 10 after the storm developed a well-defined upper-level circulation. However, further development was slow to occur and the TCFA was re-issued 24 hours later despite Hurricane Hunters suggesting that the storm did not have a low-level circulation. Early on July 12, the Joint Typhoon Warning Center (JTWC) upgraded the system into a tropical depression after Hurricane Hunters indicated that the system had developed a closed wind circulation. Twelve hours later, the Japan Meteorological Agency (JMA) classified the system as a tropical storm, bypassing the tropical depression stage. (Note: The Japan Meteorological Agency is the official Regional Specialized Meteorological Center for the western Pacific Ocean.)

After tropical cyclogenesis, the depression began to strengthen quite steadily. Meanwhile, the storm slowed down, and by July 13, Vera turned west-northwest and towards the Central Philippines. At 1200 UTC, the JMA estimated that Vera had deepened into a severe tropical storm. Several hours later, the JTWC upgraded the storm into a typhoon. At 0000 UTC on July 14, the JMA upgraded Vera into a typhoon while skirting Samar. Around this time, the Philippine Atmospheric, Geophysical and Astronomical Services Administration also monitored the storm and assigned it with the local name Bebeng. Even though meteorologists from the JTWC anticipated weakening as the storm moved through the island group, this did not occur. Convention gradually increased, until very early on July 15, when the storm started to interact with rugged terrain near Manila. Around this time, the JMA downgraded Vera into a severe tropical storm as it passed very close to Manila Bay. Within the next several hours, the JMA decreased the winds to 105 km/h (65 mph). Late on July 15, the storm began to reintensify and the JTWC upgraded Vera back to typhoon status. Early the following morning, the JMA followed suit. Accelerating, the storm continued to slowly deepen and early on July 27, the JMA reported that Vera reached its peak intensity, with winds of 135 km/h (85 mph). Around this time, the JTWC estimated peak winds of 170 km/h (105 mph), equivalent to a Category 2 hurricane on the Saffir-Simpson hurricane wind scale. After crossing Hai-Nan at peak intensity and moving into the northern portion of the Gulf of Tonkin, Vera slowly weakened before moving ashore near Haiphong at around 0000 UTC on July 18. At the time of landfall, the JMA estimated winds of 105 km/h (65 mph). The lowest sea-level pressure value recorded in the typhoon at Cửa Ông weather station (located at 21.02°N, 107.35°E) in Quảng Ninh Province, was 968.3 hPa. Severe Tropical Storm Vera rapidly weakened over land and by July 19, the JMA stopped monitoring Vera.

== Impact and aftermath ==
=== Philippines ===
Prior to the arrival of Vera, schools and government offices were shut down. Railway services were suspended; Philippine Airlines called off domestic services. Upon making landfall, Vera became the first storm to hit the nation in eight months while helping to relieve drought conditions. Typhoon Vera killed 123 and left 60 others missing across the Philippines, including 100 in Luzon alone. A total of 145 people were also injured. Around 200,000 people were homeless. The typhoon destroyed 29,054 houses and "badly" damaged 5,558 others. A total of 76,346 homes were "partially" damaged, which directly affected 628,985 people. According to authorities, 24,280 persons sought shelter. Moreover, more than 40 domestic flights were canceled due to the storm.

About 80% of Manila's 7 million residents lost power due to the storm. Low-lying areas of Manila were underwater as strong winds blew away roofs of shacks and uprooted trees. Throughout the city, four deaths happened. One man was electrocuted while another man was crushed by debris. Fifty people were confirmed to have died and 2,089 dwellings were damaged in nearby Bataan after storm surge crashed into the area. Most of the casualties in Bataan were due to drownings; the province was also the hardest hit by the storm. Throughout the area near Bataan, 10 villages were destroyed. In Pantalan Luma, all but four of the town's 400 huts were destroyed.

About 30 houses in San Pablo, Laguna were either demolished by strong winds or by falling coconut trees. Elsewhere, in Zambales, a woman was killed after she was struck by lightning. In Lucena City, a farmer was swept away via floods and two boys died due to fallen trees. The resort city of Legaspi suffered severe damage because hundreds of dwellings were destroyed, forcing many residents to seek shelter in schools or churches. Along the east coast of Luzon, seven people perished when hit by falling coconut trees in Quezon. Meanwhile, three casualties occurred in a fire in the province of Sorsogon. A total of 15 people drowned in the town of Sexmoan. The nearby towns of Macabebe and Masantol saw two drownings each. In the city of Manila or the provinces of Batangas, Quezon, Laguna, and Cavite, 34,000 people were displaced. Overall, damage totaled $42 million (1983 USD). Infrastructure damage totaled $31 million. However, damage to crops totaled to only $9.4 million (Note: All currencies are converted to United States Dollars using Philippines Measuring worth and calculator.com with an exchange rate of the year 1983.) since residents were just beginning to replant fields.

According to the Philippine Red Cross, 26,845 families necessitated emergency assistance. Government agencies were ordered to arrest profiteers, hoarders and looters. President Ferdinand Marcos ordered all relief agencies to submit damage reports so emergency funds can be issued.

=== Vietnam and China ===
After striking Vietnam, Typhoon Vera claimed three lives and damaged 2,500 houses. Heavy rains helped alleviate a prolonged drought in northern Vietnam that previously prevented the planting of rice. Because Typhoon Vera posed a threat to Southern China, 36 bulletins were issued by the Hong Kong Royal Observatory. A Typhoon signal No. 3 was also issued. After passing south of the area, a peak windspeed of 115 km/h (70 mph) was measured at Tate's Cairn. In addition, the storm generated showers and squally weather in the region. One swimmer drowned due to rough seas.

== See also ==
- Other storms named Vera
- Typhoon Xangsane (2006)
- Typhoon Rammasun - Had a similar track
- Typhoon Fengshen (2008)
- Typhoon Conson (2010)
- Tropical Storm Nalgae (2022)
- Typhoon Bualoi (2025)
