= List of storms named Verne =

The name Verne was used for two tropical cyclones in the Northwestern Pacific Ocean:

- Tropical Storm Verne (1991) (T9126, 28W – passed north of Guam.
- Typhoon Verne (1994) (T9431, 35W, Delang) – Category 4 typhoon, passed near Guam, stalled as it approached the Philippines, then moved out to sea
