= Tropical Storm Krovanh (2020) =

Pacific tropical storm in 2020

Tropical Storm Krovanh (Vicky)
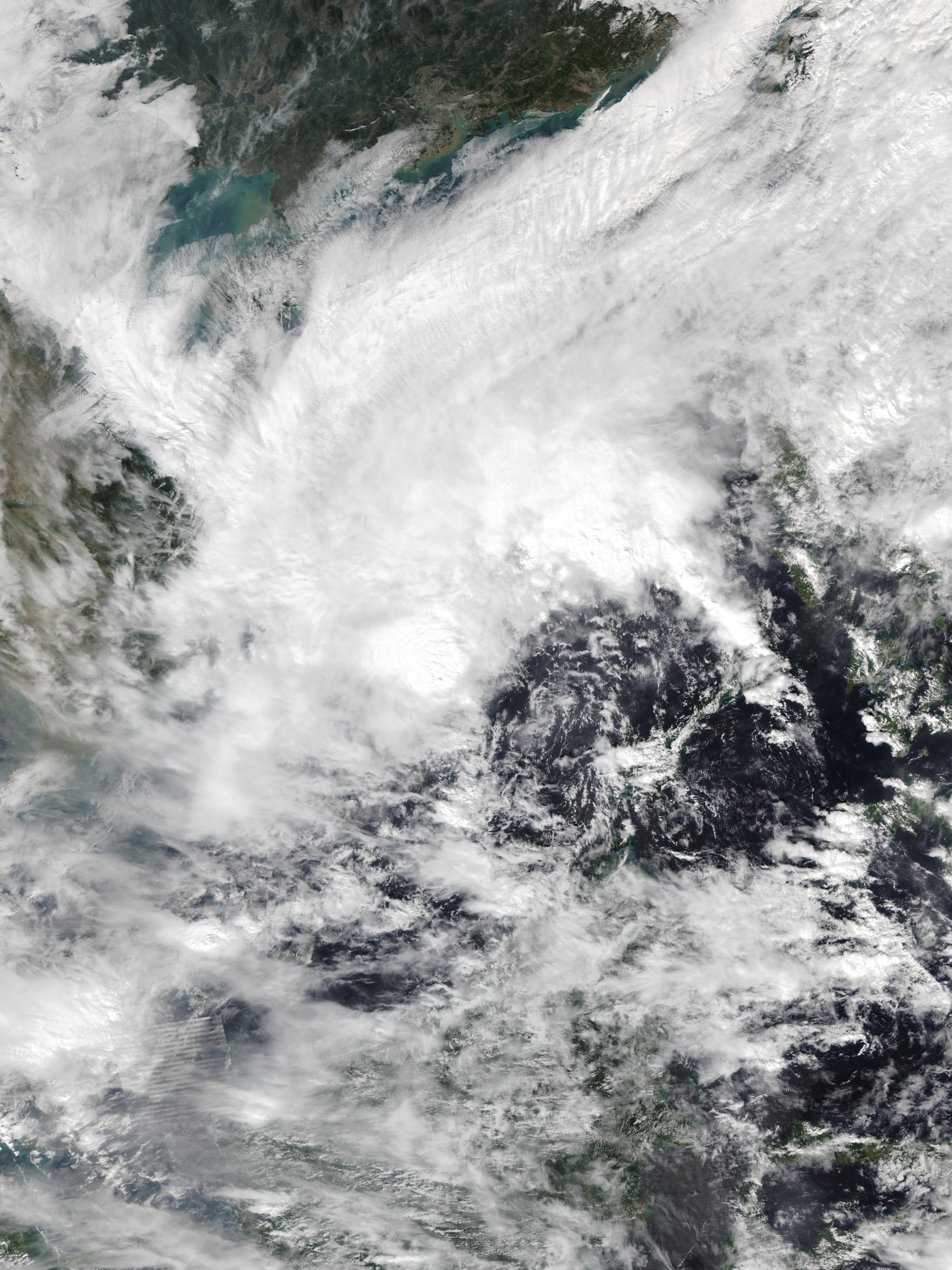
- Tropical Storm Krovanh over the South China Sea on December 20

Meteorological history
- Formed: December 18, 2020
- Dissipated: December 25, 2020

Tropical storm
- 10-minute sustained (JMA)
- Highest winds: 65 km/h (40 mph)
- Lowest pressure: 1000 hPa (mbar); 29.53 inHg

Tropical depression
- 1-minute sustained (SSHWS/JTWC)
- Highest winds: 55 km/h (35 mph)
- Lowest pressure: 1002 hPa (mbar); 29.59 inHg

Overall effects
- Fatalities: 9
- Injuries: 2
- Missing: 1
- Damage: $4.45 million (2020 USD)
- Areas affected: Philippines, Malaysia, Thailand
- IBTrACS
- Part of the 2020 Pacific typhoon season

Tropical Storm Krovanh, (Note: The name Krovanh (Khmer: ក្រវាញ, [krɑ.ˈʋaːɲ]) was contributed by Cambodia and means cardamom in Khmer.) known in the Philippines as Tropical Depression Vicky, was a tropical cyclone which caused deadly flooding in the Philippines during mid December 2020. Krovanh was the 31st depression and the final named storm of the 2020 Pacific typhoon season. Krovanh originated from a tropical depression which was first monitored by PAGASA, late on December 17. The system strengthened with PAGASA naming it Vicky, meanwhile the JMA monitored it as a low pressure area. The depression then made several landfalls over the Philippines on December 18–19 before moving out of the PAR on December 20, as it strengthened into a tropical storm according to the JMA and was named Krovanh. However, Krovanh was downgraded back to a tropical depression the next day, with the JTWC issuing their final advisory on December 22.

Krovanh caused flash flooding and mudslides across the Philippines damaging numerous homes. 9 people were killed by the storm and 1 person remains missing as of December 23, 2020. Damage in the Philippines totaled to around ₱214 million (US$4.45 million)

== Meteorological history ==
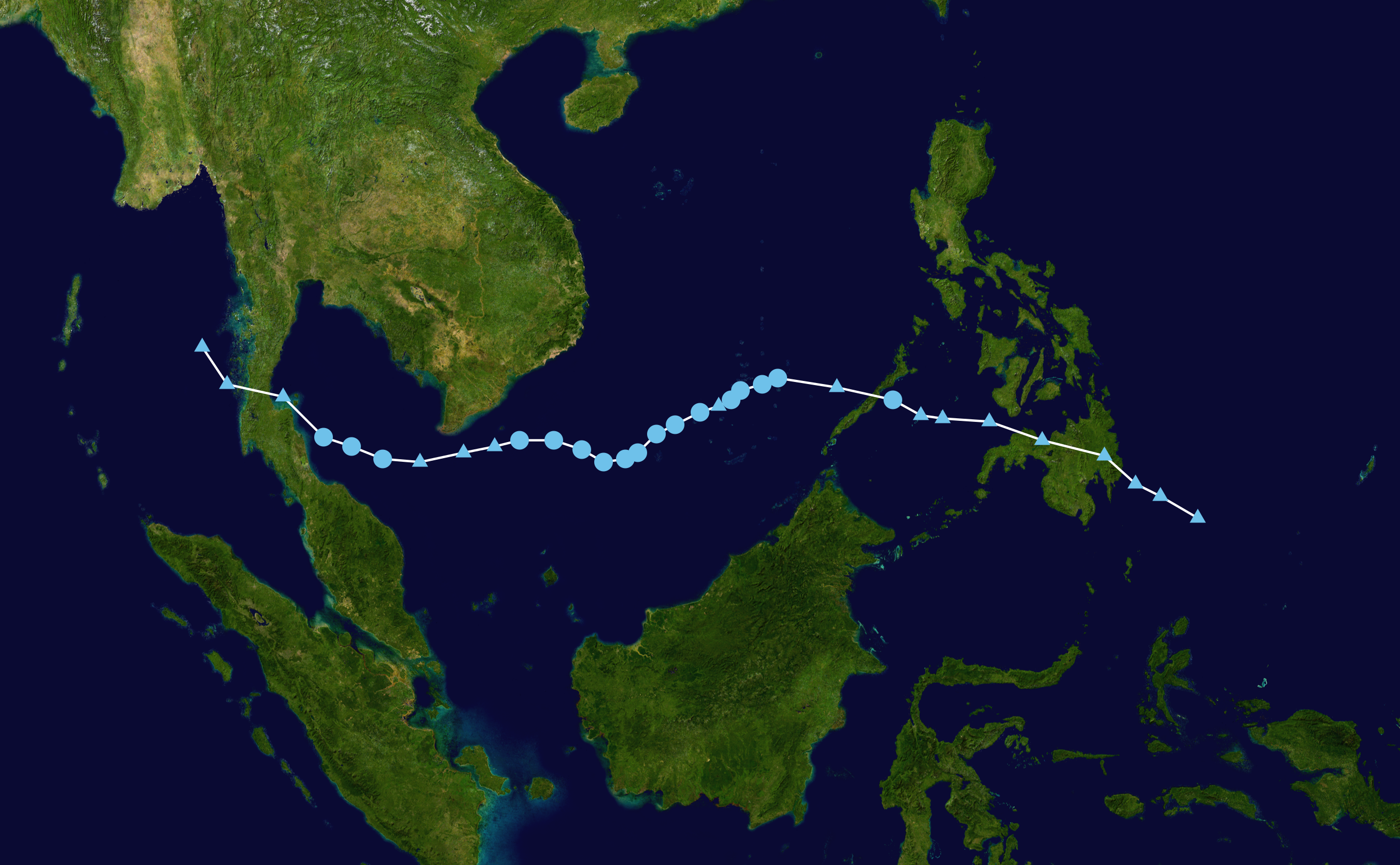
Map plotting the storm's track and intensity, according to the Saffir–Simpson scale Map key Saffir–Simpson scale Tropical depression (≤38 mph, ≤62 km/h) Tropical storm (39–73 mph, 63–118 km/h) Category 1 (74–95 mph, 119–153 km/h) Category 2 (96–110 mph, 154–177 km/h) Category 3 (111–129 mph, 178–208 km/h) Category 4 (130–156 mph, 209–251 km/h) Category 5 (≥157 mph, ≥252 km/h) Unknown Storm type Tropical cyclone Subtropical cyclone Extratropical cyclone, remnant low, tropical disturbance, or monsoon depression

On December 17 at 21:00 UTC, the PAGASA began issuing bulletins for a system 140 nautical miles (260 km) east-southeast of Davao. The PAGASA had already recognized the system as a tropical depression and named it Vicky, however at the time, the Japan Meteorological Agency (JMA) only recognized the system as a low-pressure area. The next day, the JMA followed suit and recognized the system as a tropical depression. At 14:00 PHT (6:00 UTC), the system made landfall in Baganga, Davao Oriental. 9 hours later, it emerged off the coast of Misamis Oriental and entered the Bohol Sea, later entering the Sulu Sea on the next day at 5:00 PHT (21:00 UTC). On December 19 at 23:00 PHT (15:00 UTC), the system made its second landfall over central Palawan, emerging into the South China Sea shortly after. As the storm traversed the South China Sea, the system had strengthened into a tropical storm according to the JMA as it emerged into a region of relatively favorable atmospheric conditions, thus given the name Krovanh. (Note: The name Krovanh (Khmer: ក្រវាញ, [krɑ.ˈʋaːɲ]) was contributed by Cambodia and means cardamom in Khmer.) On December 20 at 14:00 PHT (6:00 UTC), Krovanh left the Philippine Area of Responsibility, although storm signals were still raised for the Kalayaan Islands. The PAGASA then upgraded Krovanh into a tropical storm, and issued a Signal No. 2 warning for the Kalayaan Islands. The next day, December 21, Krovanh was downgraded into a tropical depression by both the JMA and by the PAGASA in their final advisories for the storm. The JTWC then issued their final warning on Krovanh the next day shortly after most of its central convection had dissipated due to increasingly hostile wind shear.

== Preparations and impact ==
=== Philippines ===
Large swaths of Visayas and Mindanao were placed under Signal No. 1 warnings due to Krovanh. Sea travel was subsequently suspended in the areas affected by the warnings. Roughly 10,000 people stayed in shelters. Floods and landslides were triggered in Cebu, Agusan del Sur, Davao de Oro, and in Leyte, where two senior citizens were killed in a landslide. In Lapu-Lapu City, 300 residents were forced to evacuate after 76 houses near the shore were swept into sea. According to NDRRMC, Krovanh killed nine people, injured two and one other went missing. Damages have been calculated to be ₱214 million (US$4.45 million). At least 31,408 families were affected by the storm in the Philippines.

=== Malaysia ===
The Malaysian Meteorological Department issued an advisory for the state of Sabah, for the possibility of rough seas and gusty winds associated with Krovanh.

== See also ==
- Weather of 2020
- Tropical cyclones in 2020
- Typhoon Tembin (2017)
- Tropical Storm Usagi (2018)
