= Typhoon Viola (1969) =

Pacific typhoon in 1969

Typhoon Viola (Elang)
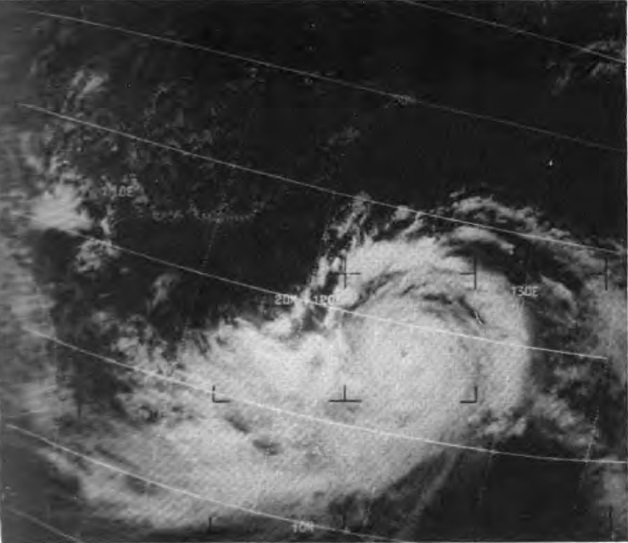
- Viola nearing peak intensity on July 26, with the system starting to batter the Northern Luzon that day.

Meteorological history
- Formed: July 22, 1969
- Dissipated: July 31, 1969

Unknown-strength storm
- 10-minute sustained (JMA)
- Lowest pressure: 900 hPa (mbar); 26.58 inHg

Category 4-equivalent super typhoon
- 1-minute sustained (SSHWS/JTWC)
- Highest winds: 240 km/h (150 mph)
- Lowest pressure: 897 hPa (mbar); 26.49 inHg

Overall effects
- Fatalities: 10,039 estimated
- Missing: 15
- Damage: Unknown
- Areas affected: Caroline Islands, Yap, Philippines, Taiwan, South China
- Part of the 1969 Pacific typhoon season

Typhoon Viola, known in the Philippines as Super Typhoon Elang and in Mainland China as the Niutianyang Wind Disaster, was a destructive and deadly tropical cyclone that is estimated to have killed over 10,000 individuals in Guangdong, another 20 in the Philippine archipelago and 11 in Taiwan during mid to late July 1969. The sixth recorded system, fourth typhoon, and the first super typhoon of the 1969 Pacific typhoon season, the system was first noted on July 20 as an area of convection to the south of Guam. It slowly organized, becoming a tropical depression two days later before strengthening to a tropical storm on that day. The Joint Typhoon Warning Center gave the name Viola to the intensifying system. It then brushed some islands, reefs, and shoals of the Caroline Islands as it moved to the northwest. A trough to its south turned the system to the north-northwest before intensifying to a severe tropical storm as it entered the Philippine Area of Responsibility, assigning the name Elang by the Philippine Weather Bureau (which reorganized more than three years later to become PAGASA).

Shortly after, it further strengthened to a typhoon following an eye forming over the center, before rapidly intensifying to a Category 4 super typhoon as it battered the Northern Philippines, particularly the Batanes on July 26. It then reached its peak intensity early the next day, with maximum sustained winds of 240 km/h (150 mph) and a minimum barometric pressure of 896 hPa, equivalent to a super typhoon on the Saffir-Simpson Scale. Interaction with Taiwan and South China, unfavorable environment, and lack of outflow weakened Viola below super typhoon status until it made landfall near Hong Kong as a minimal typhoon on July 28. It rapidly weakened to a tropical storm and remained in that intensity until it further weakened on the midday of the same day below gale-force winds. Viola then degenerated to a remnant low afterward before dissipating on July 31 near Vietnam.

In the Philippines, Viola killed 28 due to landslides in two subsequent areas; though these were unknown. In Guangdong, strong winds, large storm surges and torrential rainfall caused flash floods and mudslides that killed an estimate of 10,000 people in that area alone. The large circulation from Viola also affected Taiwan, killing another 11. Total deaths from the typhoon were estimated at 10,031, while the number of injuries were unknown. The total damages were described as catastrophic, though the numbers were also unknown.

== Meteorological history ==
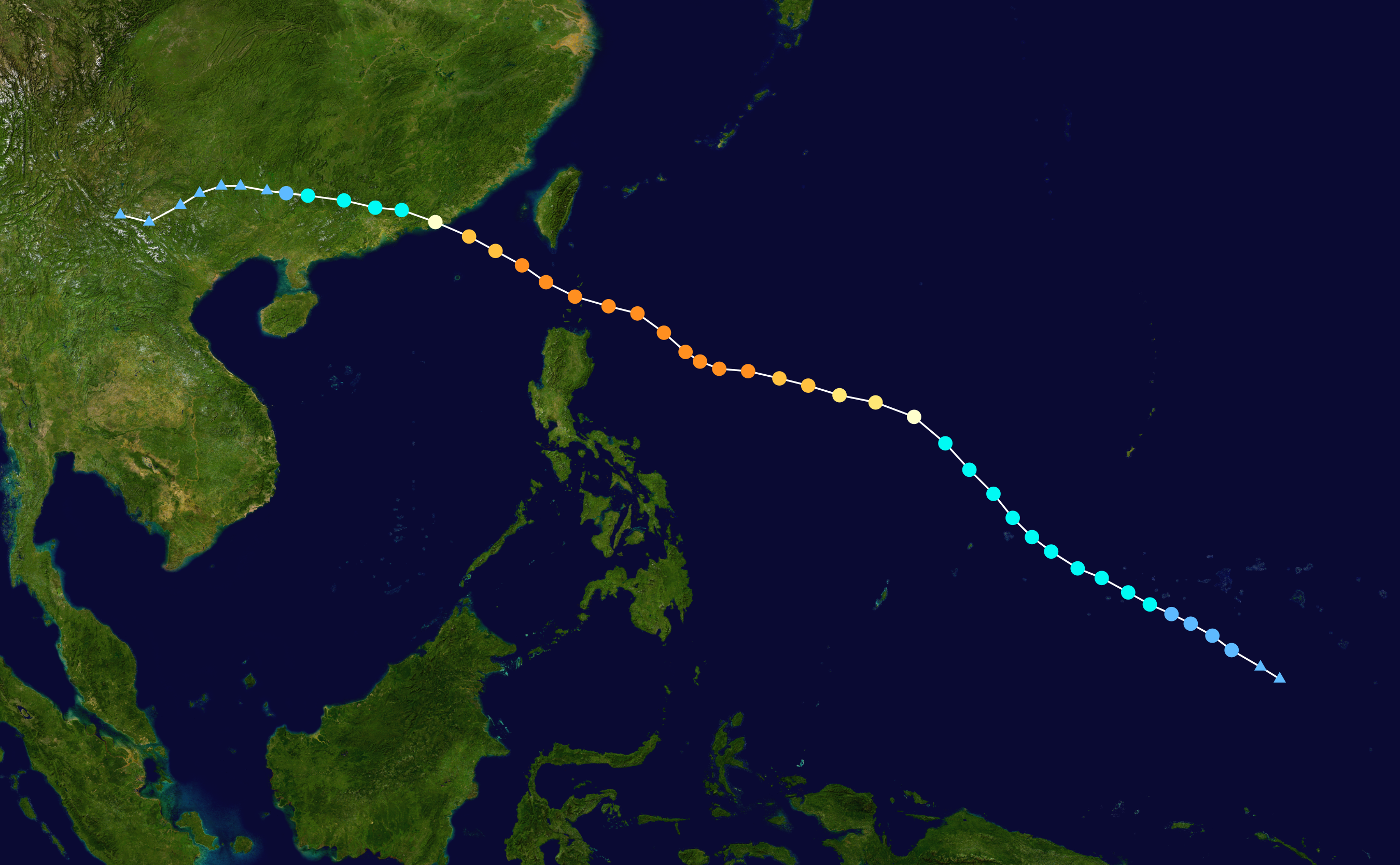
Map plotting the storm's track and intensity, according to the Saffir–Simpson scale Map key Saffir–Simpson scale Tropical depression (≤38 mph, ≤62 km/h) Tropical storm (39–73 mph, 63–118 km/h) Category 1 (74–95 mph, 119–153 km/h) Category 2 (96–110 mph, 154–177 km/h) Category 3 (111–129 mph, 178–208 km/h) Category 4 (130–156 mph, 209–251 km/h) Category 5 (≥157 mph, ≥252 km/h) Unknown Storm type Tropical cyclone Subtropical cyclone Extratropical cyclone, remnant low, tropical disturbance, or monsoon depression

At 00:00 UTC (8:00 am CST) on July 20, the China Meteorological Agency started to monitor an area of convection, located nearly 535 miles to the southwest of Palikir, Federated States of Micronesia. At the same time, the Joint Typhoon Warning Center started to monitor the disturbance, which was located unusually near the equator. The system slowly moved to the northwest, due to a subtropical ridge, which was located near Mindanao. There, it quickly organized with its convection wrapping near its obscured low-level circulation center as being seen by radar imagery, which is located on Guam. Easterly wind shear also started to impact the system during that time, although the disturbance developed further. At 12:00 UTC (08:00 pm CST) that day, the CMA upgraded the system to a minor tropical depression, with their estimates of 55 km/h (34 mph) on the disturbance. On the next day, the system's organization became obscured due to moderate wind shear, although the CMA upgraded the depression to a tropical storm at 12:00 UTC (8:00 pm CST) based on their estimates of 65 km/h (40 mph). Shortly before midnight, at 23:00 UTC (9:00 am ChST, the JTWC started to issue their first routined advisory as Tropical Depression 05W, based on synoptic data by the Caroline Islands and the same estimate by the CMA of 55 km/h (34 mph). Early the next day, it was estimated that 05W is located, approximately 340 miles to the south of Guam. Between 09:00 and 11:00 UTC (7:00 pm – 9:00 pm ChST), the system was upgraded to a tropical storm by the JTWC and was named Viola.

After being named Viola, Viola brushed some islands, reefs, and shoals of the Caroline Islands as it moved to the northwest. A trough to its south turned the system to the north-northwest before intensifying to a severe tropical storm as it entered the Philippine Area of Responsibility, assigning the name Elang by the PAGASA. Shortly after, it further strengthened to a typhoon following an eye forming over the center, before rapidly intensifying to a Category 4 super typhoon as it battered the Northern Philippines, particularly the Batanes on July 26. It then reached its peak intensity early the next day, with maximum sustained winds of 240 km/h (150 mph) and a minimum barometric pressure of 896 hPa, equivalent to a super typhoon on the Saffir-Simpson Scale. Interaction with Taiwan and South China, unfavorable environment, and lack of outflow weakened Viola below super typhoon status until it made landfall near Hong Kong as a minimal typhoon on July 28. It rapidly weakened to a tropical storm and remained in that intensity until it further weakened on the midday of the same day below gale-force winds. Viola then degenerated to a remnant low afterward before dissipating on July 31 near Vietnam.

== Impact ==
Philippines
Over 28 individuals died and 17 were missing due to the large circulation of Viola (known as Elang) in the Philippines. A boat capsized somewhere near Baguio due to large waves and strong winds from the typhoon, killing 7 out of 23 passengers. Another landslide in the summer capital of the country killed three persons as they were trapped inside a house, never being rescued back. A woman was reported dead in an unknown place due to a mudslide. Many towns and cities in the northern and central part of the country were isolated by floods from overflowed rivers. Highways and main roads were also washed out and destroyed due to the floodwaters. Power outages were also experienced by residents throughout Northern and Central Luzon. Crops and farmlands were also destroyed, which costs thousands of dollars. Low-lying floods were also seen in Manila. Four provinces sustained the most catastrophic damages from the typhoon, although the total numbers were unknown.
The typhoon struck during the visit of American president Richard Nixon in the Philippines. At the time the president visited the Malacañang Palace, foot-high waters were experienced by him.
However, this was described as victory by the first woman to fly into the eye of Viola, which is Second Lieutenant Clemmer T. Slaton. This also helped to estimate the lowest barometric pressure of the typhoon, which she and her team recorded at 896 mbar. They went back into the Clark Air Base safe after the exploration.
Formosa, British Hong Kong, and South China
In Formosa (present-day Taiwan), the outer circulation of Viola also affected the country. The cliiffside highways were blocked and ferry services were suspended due to the typhoon. Torrential rainfalls led to flash floods up to four meters throughout Formosa. Over 1,292 houses were destroyed and seawater intrusion were seen and reported in Chiayi County. A massive storm surge also destroyed houses and resorts in the southern part of the country, which described by some officials there as the most destructive tidal wave to hit Formosa in 50 years. 11 individuals were reported dead due to Viola throughout the country, while 63 more were injured. The total damages were estimated at millions, but the numerical values were unknown.
