= 2005–06 South Pacific cyclone season =

Tropical cyclone season

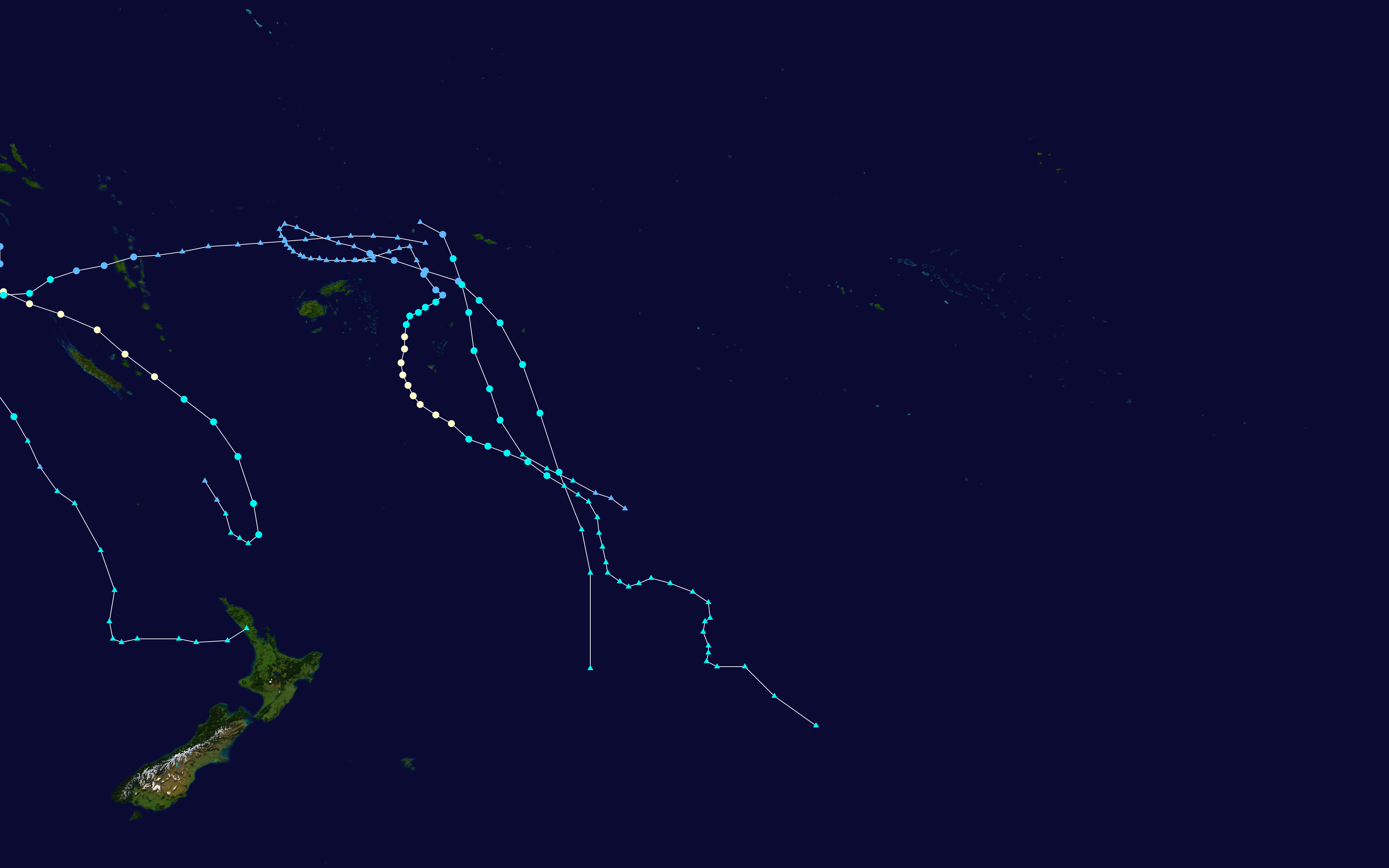
- Season summary map

Seasonal boundaries
- First system formed: November 30, 2005
- Last system dissipated: April 21, 2006

Strongest storm
- Name: Wati
  - Maximum winds: 155 km/h (100 mph) (10-minute sustained)
  - Lowest pressure: 950 hPa (mbar)

Seasonal statistics
- Total depressions: 15
- Tropical cyclones: 5
- Severe tropical cyclones: 3
- Total fatalities: None reported
- Total damage: $26,000 (2006 USD)

Related articles
- 2005–06 South-West Indian Ocean cyclone season; 2005–06 Australian region cyclone season

The 2005–06 South Pacific cyclone season was an event in the annual cycle of tropical cyclone formation. It began on November 1, 2005, and ended on April 30, 2006. These dates conventionally delimit the period of each year when most tropical cyclones form in the southern Pacific Ocean east of 160°E. Additionally, the regional tropical cyclone operational plan defines a tropical cyclone year separately from a tropical cyclone season, and the "tropical cyclone year" runs from July 1, 2005, to June 30, 2006.

Tropical cyclones between 160°E and 120°W and north of 25°S are monitored by the Fiji Meteorological Service in Nadi. Those that move south of 25°S are monitored by the Tropical Cyclone Warning Centre in Wellington, New Zealand.

== Seasonal forecasts ==
Source Record	Tropical Cyclone	Severe Tropical Cyclone	Ref
Record high:	1997–98:16	1982–83:10
Record low:	2003–04: 3	1994–95: 1
FMS	7–9	-
Activity during the season:	5	3

During October 2005, both RSMC Nadi and New Zealand's National Institute of Water and Atmospheric Research issued seasonal forecasts which contained information on what was expected to occur during the 2005–06 tropical cyclone season. Both agencies expected that the season would see a near average amount of tropical cyclone activity due there being no El Niño or La Niña. As a result of these conditions RSMC Nadi predicted that between 7–9 tropical cyclones would develop while NIWA did not predict how many tropical cyclone there would be during the season. RSMC Nadi also reported that Fiji had a higher chance of being hit by a tropical cyclone this season than during recent previous seasons. NIWA also predicted that there was an average risk of a tropical cyclone coming within 550 km (340 mi), of: Fiji, Tonga, Niue, Vanuatu, New Caledonia, Wallis and Futuna, the Southern Cook Islands, Samoa, and New Zealand.

== Systems ==
=== Tropical Depression 03F ===
- Tropical depression (Australian scale)
- Duration: December 8 – December 16
- Peak intensity: 35 km/h (25 mph) (10-min); 1001 hPa (mbar)

Formed on December 8 and dissipated on December 18, 2005.

=== Tropical Cyclone Tam ===
- Category 1 tropical cyclone (Australian scale)
- Tropical storm (SSHWS)
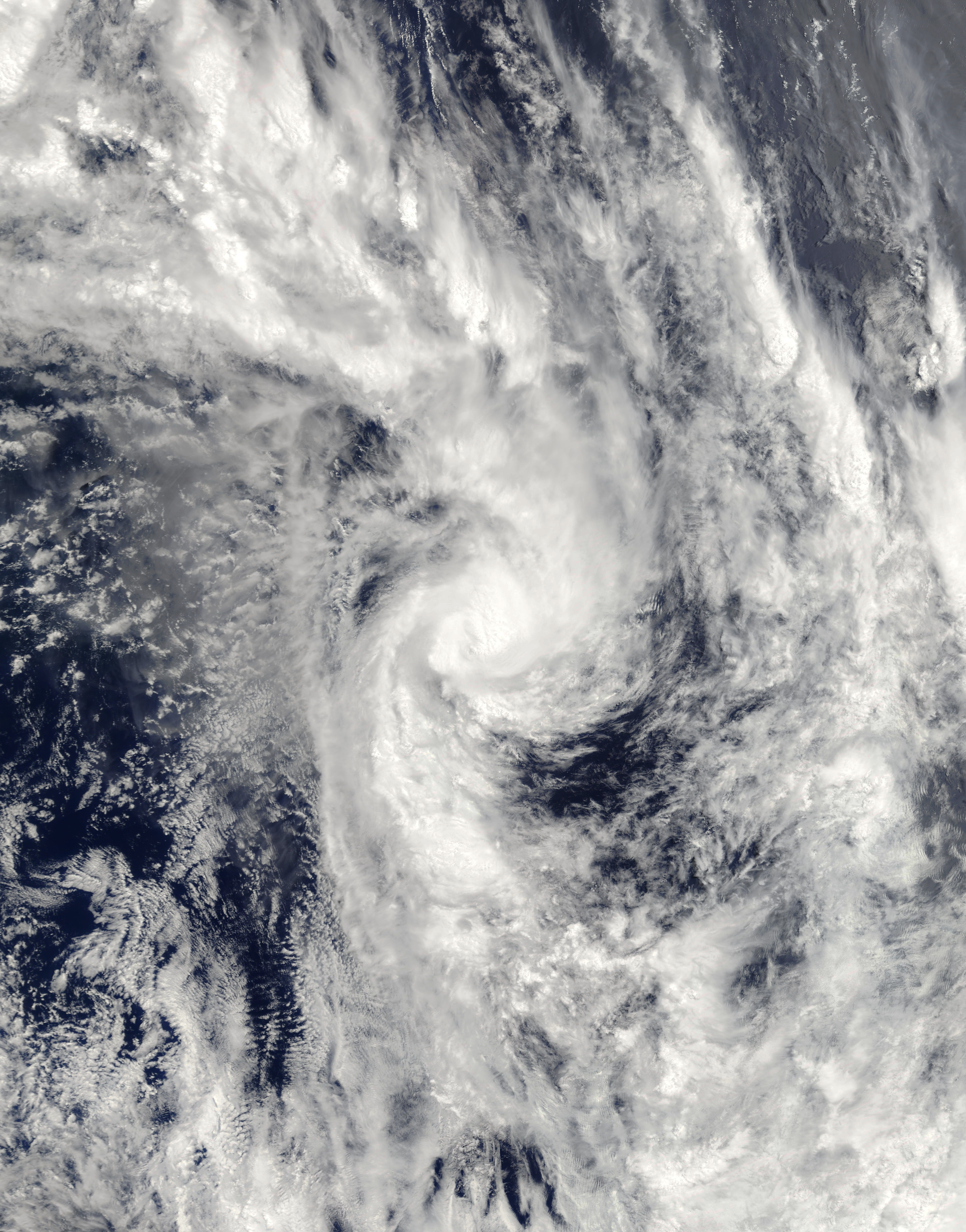
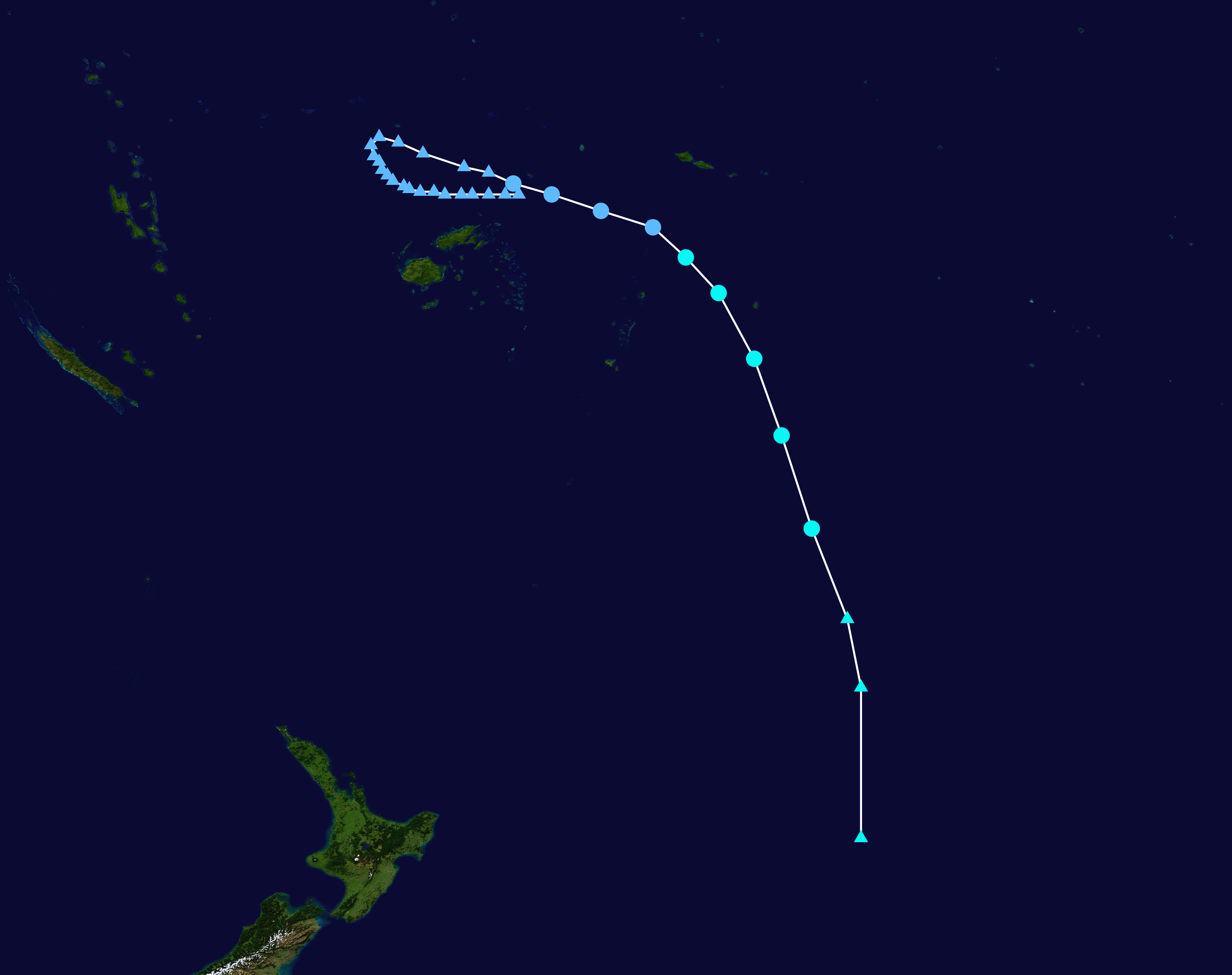
- Duration: January 6 – January 14
- Peak intensity: 85 km/h (50 mph) (10-min); 987 hPa (mbar)

Tropical Depression 04F formed about 370 km (230 mi) to the north-northeast of Fiji on January 6, which moved slowly westward. Although the depression was located within an area of low wind shear, little intensification occurred, as a lack of low-level moisture hindered the development of deep convection. By January 9, shower and thunderstorm activity associated with the disturbance increased as it began to interact with the South Pacific Convergence Zone. Another tropical depression developed in the vicinity, but weakened. The following day, the RSMC Nadi upgraded Tropical Depression 04F to a tropical cyclone and gave it the name Tam, making it the first named storm of the 2005–06 season. Several hours later, the storm passed close to Niuafo'ou with winds of 65 km/h (40 mph). By 0000 UTC on January 13, the JTWC classified Tam as Tropical Cyclone 06P. Tam strengthened further to attain winds of 85 km/h (53 mph) around 0600 UTC. However, with both wind shear and the forward motion of the storm continuing to increase, convection rapidly became dislocated from the center. Around 0000 UTC on January 14, Tam entered the area of responsibility of the Tropical Cyclone Warning Centre in Wellington, New Zealand as it moved quickly southward. Soon after, it transitioned into an extratropical cyclone, which dissipated early on January 15.

As Tam was developing, residents attempted to evacuate the island by plane, with the primary target of Fiji. Only a few flights took off before officials closed the airport, stranding numerous passengers. Late on January 11, RSMC Nadi placed Tonga and Futuna under a tropical cyclone alert and also placed Tonga and Wallis under a strong wind warning. On the next day RSMC Nadi placed northern Tonga and later Niue under a tropical cyclone gale warning. On January 11, Tropical Depression 04F produced a record 293.2 mm (11.54 in) of rain in a 24‑hour span on Rotuma. However, little damage resulted from the heavy precipitation. Cyclone Tam produced heavy rainfall in American Samoa which triggered damaging floods. Several buildings were flooded, and an estimated 70% of the island's crops were destroyed. Sustained winds of up to 55 km/h (34 mph), with gusts reaching 95 km/h (59 mph), tore a few roofs off unsecured homes. Scattered power outages were reported throughout the island. A few landslides were also reported as a result of the storm. Damage from the storm totaled $26,000 on the island. Relatively little damage was recorded in Futuna; there, the storm downed several trees and stranded a yacht on a reef. On Niuafo'ou, a weather station recorded sustained winds of 55 km/h (34 mph) with gusts of up to 75 km/h (47 mph), along with a minimum pressure of 991 hPa (mbar). Minor damage, consisting of fallen branches and isolated power outages also occurred on Niue.

=== Tropical Depression 05F ===
- Tropical depression (Australian scale)
- Duration: January 10 – January 13
- Peak intensity: 55 km/h (35 mph) (10-min); 996 hPa (mbar)

Formed on January 10 and dissipated on January 13, 2006.

=== Tropical Cyclone Urmil ===
- Category 2 tropical cyclone (Australian scale)
- Tropical storm (SSHWS)
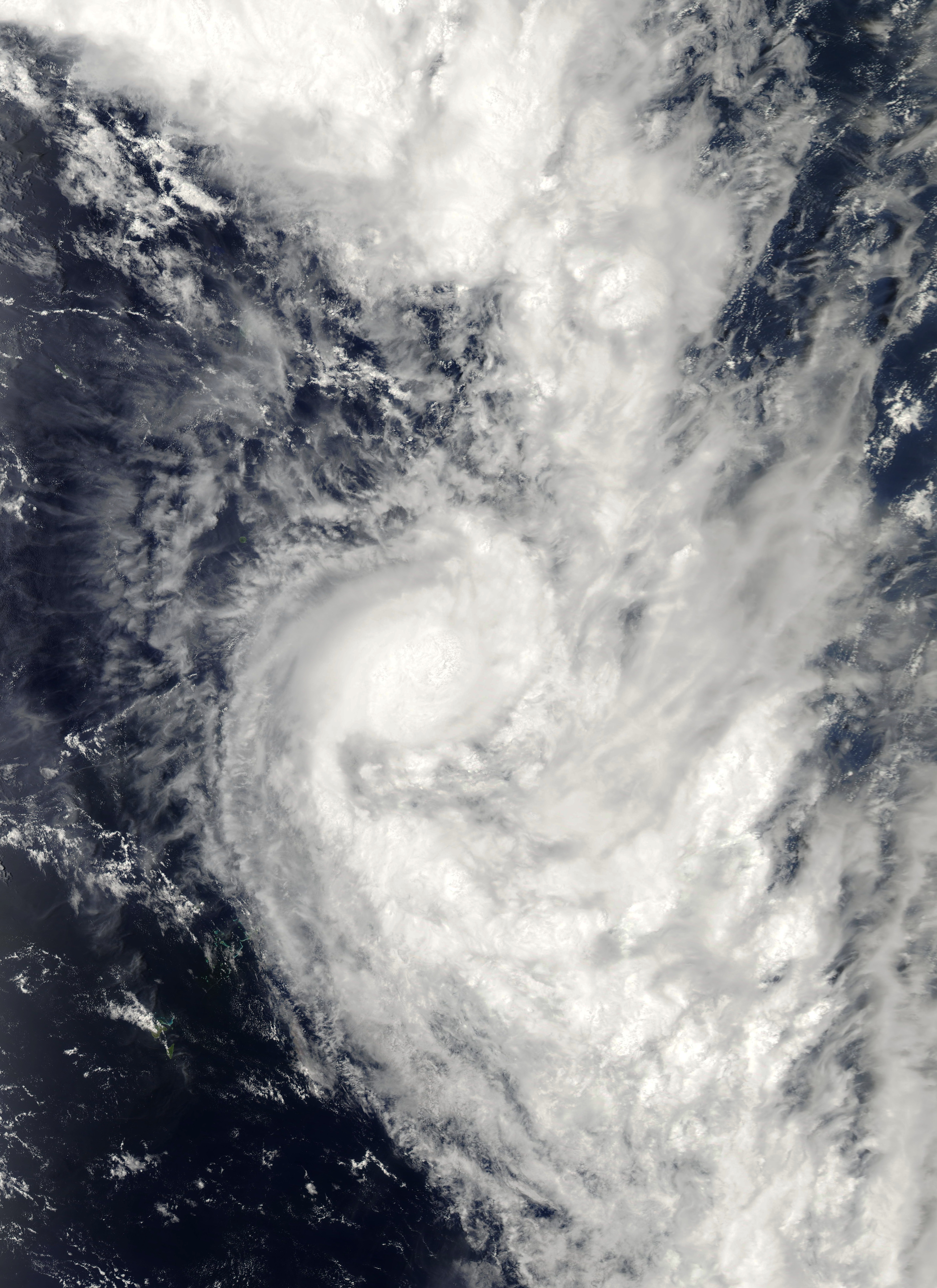
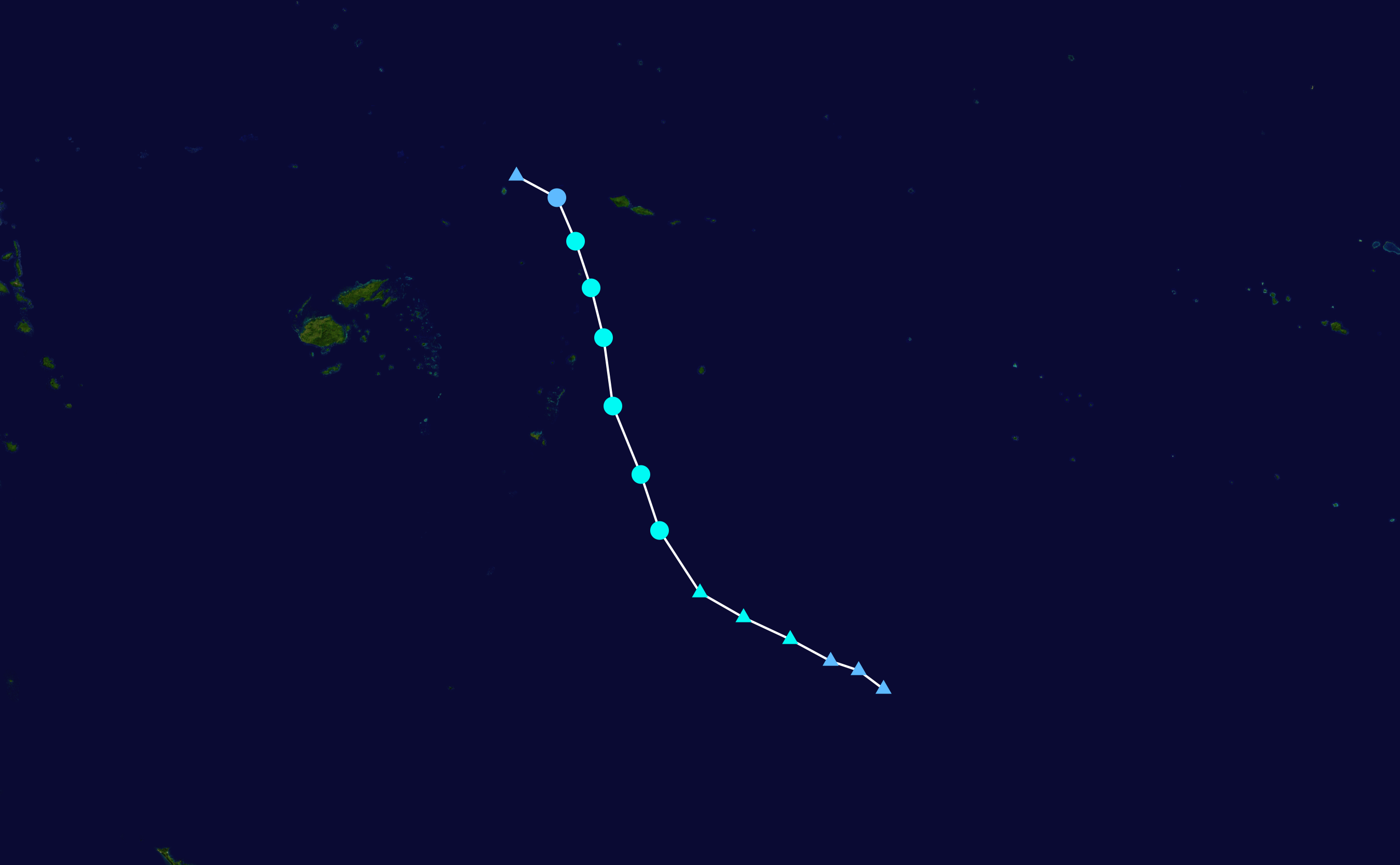
- Duration: January 13 – January 15
- Peak intensity: 110 km/h (70 mph) (10-min); 975 hPa (mbar)

On January 13, Tropical Disturbance 06F formed over the open waters of the south Pacific Ocean, about 370 km (230 mi) west of American Samoa. Forming in the wake of Cyclone Tam, the disturbance rapidly organized within a favorable environment, including warm waters and moderate wind shear. RSMC Nadi upgraded 06F to Tropical Cyclone Urmil while the system was near Niuatoputapu, Tonga. At 0600 UTC on January 14, the JTWC classified Urmil as Tropical Cyclone 07P. The storm reached peak winds of 110 km/h (70 mph) according to both the RSMC Nadi and the JTWC, making it a high-end Category 2 cyclone on the Australian Scale. Stronger wind shear and faster forward motion caused the storm to become disorganized and devoid of convection. On January 15, Urmil transitioned into an extratropical cyclone, and was subsequently absorbed into the mid-latitude westerlies.

Upon being designated Tropical Disturbance 06F, tropical cyclone alerts and strong wind warnings were issued for Niue, Tonga, the Cook Islands, and French Polynesia. A flood advisory and small craft advisory were issued for Samoa. Early on January 14, 06F passed close to Tafahi and Niuatoputapu, produced heavy rains and near gale-force winds over the islands. The highest winds in Tonga were recorded on Niuatoputapu; sustained winds reached 35 km/h (25 mph) with gusts to 65 km/h (40 mph). The winds caused minor damages, mainly limited to vegetation. Some fruit trees were damaged, mainly banana trees. The rains from Urmil exaggerated flooding produced by Cyclone Tam just a few days earlier.

=== Tropical Depression 07F ===
- Tropical depression (Australian scale)
- Duration: January 15 – January 16
- Peak intensity: 30 km/h (15 mph) (10-min);

The seventh depression of the season developed on January 15 as Urmil was dissipating. A weak system, 07F formed out of a slow moving tropical disturbance about 790 km (490 mi) north of Fiji. The system peaked in intensity with winds of 30 km/h (19 mph) later that day. On January 16, the low dissipated about 325 km (202 mi) west-northwest of Fiji.

=== Severe Tropical Cyclone Jim ===
- Category 3 severe tropical cyclone (Australian scale)
- Category 1 tropical cyclone (SSHWS)
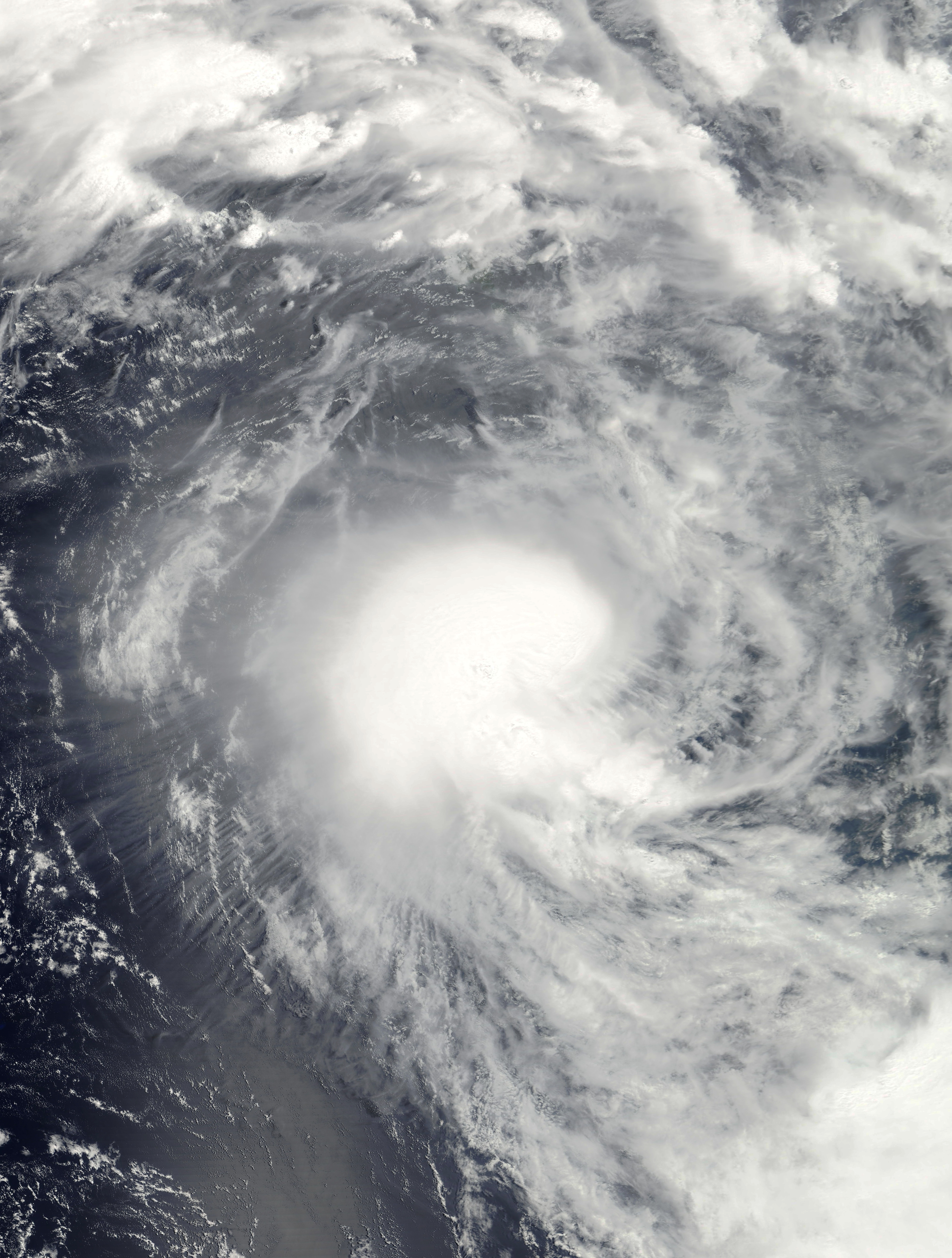
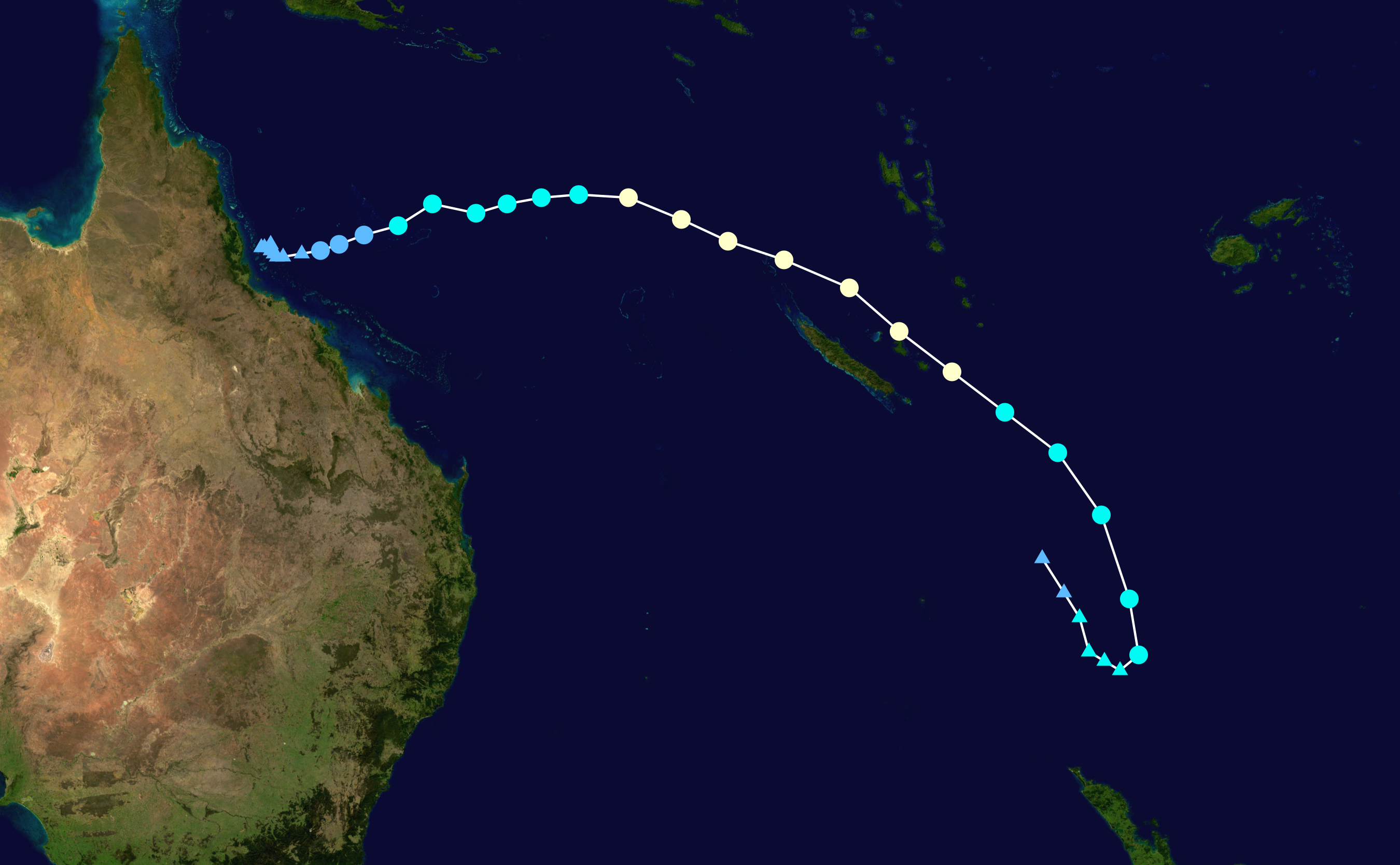
- Duration: January 30 – February 3 (entered basin)
- Peak intensity: 150 km/h (90 mph) (10-min); 955 hPa (mbar)

Cyclone Jim originated in the Australian region, and moved into Fiji's area of responsibility on January 30. Jim gradually turned south-southeastward and became extratropical on February 1. The extratropical remnants of Jim (08F) lingered around and then moved northwest.

Despite being well to the west of that country, Cyclone Jim was blamed for extensive flooding in Fiji, with the western coast of the island of Viti Levu – including the city of Lautoka – inundated by floodwaters on January 29. No fatalities were reported in any of the areas affected by the cyclone.

=== Tropical Depression 10F ===
- Tropical depression (Australian scale)
- Duration: February 2 – February 4
- Peak intensity: 55 km/h (35 mph) (10-min); 998 hPa (mbar)

The tenth depression of the season formed on February 2 about 150 km (93 mi) southwest of Niue. High wind shear prevented significant strengthening, with winds peaking at 55 km/h (34 mph) and a minimum pressure of 998 hPa (mbar). Tracking erratically in a southerly direction, the depression slowly weakened as convection was displaced by wind shear. Tropical Depression 10F was last monitored on February 4 about 740 km (460 mi) southeast of Tongatapu.

=== Tropical Depression 11F ===
- Tropical depression (Australian scale)
- Duration: February 8 – February 10
- Peak intensity: 35 km/h (25 mph) (10-min);

Formed on February 8 and dissipated on February 10, 2006.

=== Severe Tropical Cyclone Vaianu ===
- Category 3 severe tropical cyclone (Australian scale)
- Category 1 tropical cyclone (SSHWS)
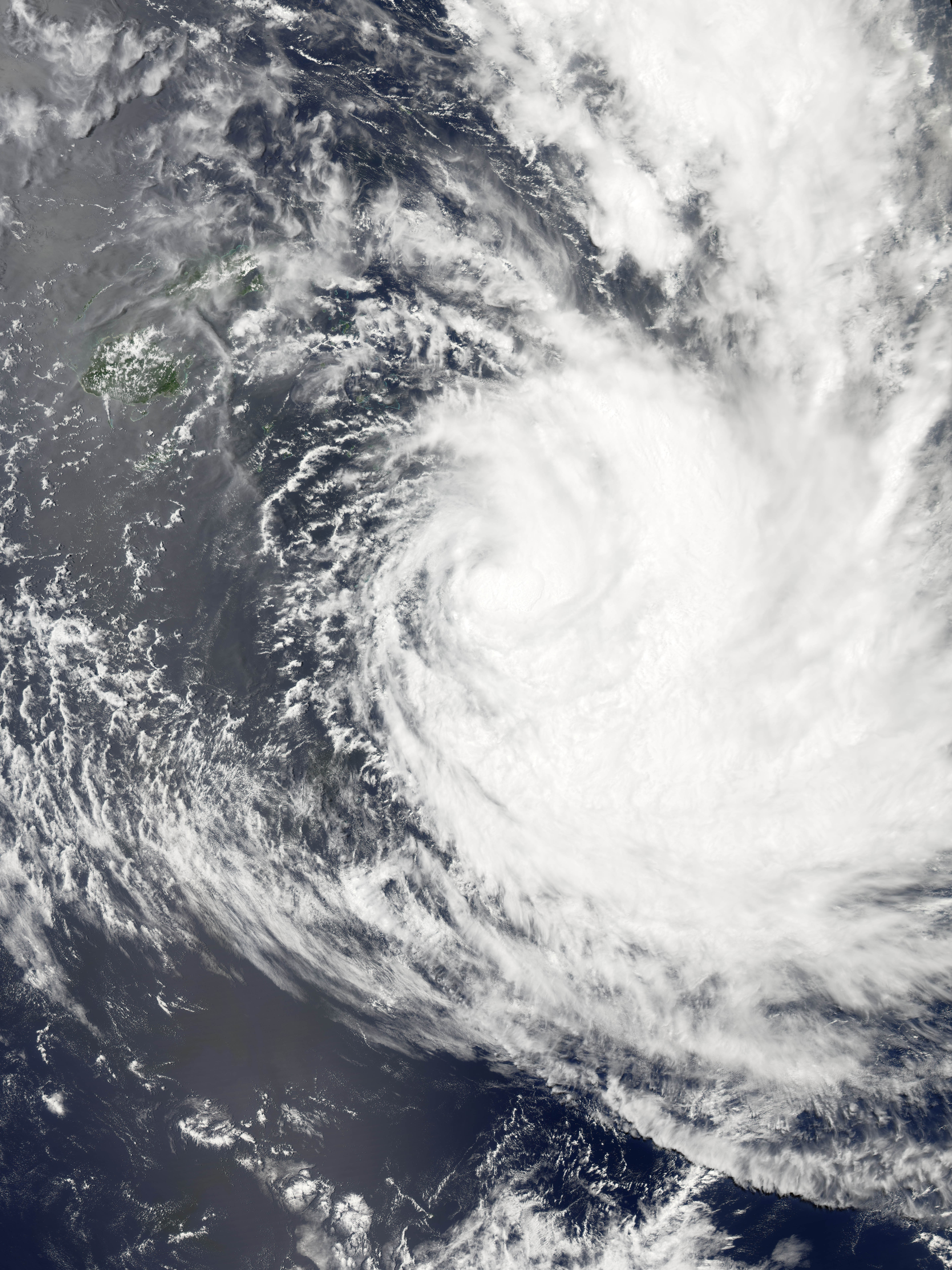
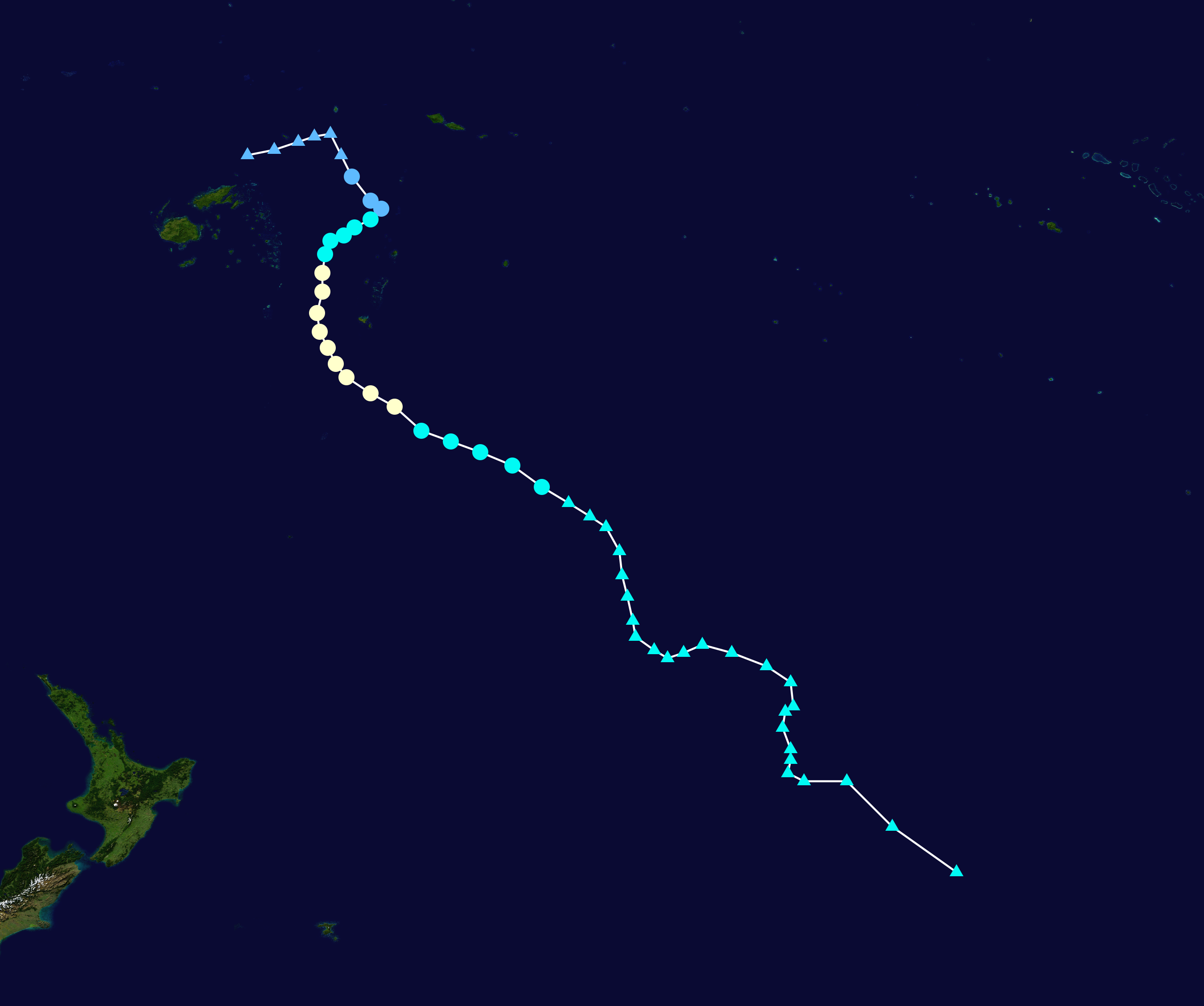
- Duration: February 9 – February 22
- Peak intensity: 130 km/h (80 mph) (10-min); 965 hPa (mbar)

Late on February 9, Tropical Depression 12F developed within a convergence zone about 140 km (87 mi) northeast of Vanua Levu. The depression tracked southeastward, although further development was initially inhibited by wind shear. During the next day, the depression turned towards the southeast and moved into a more favorable environment for intensification, with a ridge to its southeast. On February 11, it strengthened into a Category 1 tropical cyclone on the Australian tropical cyclone intensity scale, and was named Vaianu. JTWC also designated the system as Tropical Cyclone 12P. On February 11, the system significantly organized, and at 1200 UTC that day, RSMC Nadi reported that the depression had intensified into a Category 1 tropical cyclone on the Australian tropical cyclone intensity scale; it was assigned the name Vaianu. Vaianu continued to strengthen, and passed west of Tonga. The JTWC reported that the cyclone peaked in intensity at 1200 UTC on February 13, with maximum sustained 1-minute winds of 140 km/h (85 mph). RSMC Nadi assessed the storm as having peaked slightly later, with 10-minute winds of 130 km/h (80 mph), which made it a Category 3 severe tropical cyclone. The storm held its strength for some time as it moved southward between Ono-i-Lau and Tongatapu. Beginning to accelerate, Vaianu entered the area of responsibility of the Tropical Cyclone Warning Centre in Wellington, New Zealand. It curved southeastward and slowly deteriorated due to increasing wind shear and colder sea surface temperatures. The JTWC downgraded it to a tropical storm on February 15, and by the next day it was undergoing extratropical transition. At 0600 UTC, the JTWC classified it as extratropical, but it remained a powerful storm system for several days as it tracked over the open ocean.

RSMC Nadi issued a tropical cyclone alert for Tonga, including a gale warning for the Vavau, Haapai, and Nomuka islands and a tropical cyclone warning for southern Tonga. Businesses in Nuku'alofa closed as the storm passed by. At Fuaʻamotu International Airport, sustained winds blew at 68 km/h (42 mph), with gusts to 100 km/h (62 mph). Rainfall there totaled 97.7 mm (3.85 in). The storm caused power outages across its path that took up a week to fully restore. On Tongatapu and Eua, the storm inflicted extensive crop damage, and it is estimated that 70% of the banana crop was destroyed. In Nuku'alofa, the capital of Tonga, flooding of low-lying areas reportedly shut down the city for two days. The high winds brought down trees and dispersed debris throughout the region, while schools were forced to close. RSMC Nadi also placed the Lau Islands under a strong wind warning, and a damaging swell warning was declared for Fiji.

=== Tropical Depression 13F ===
- Tropical depression (Australian scale)
- Duration: February 19 – February 26
- Peak intensity: 35 km/h (25 mph) (10-min);

Formed on February 19 and dissipated on February 26, 2006.

=== Severe Tropical Cyclone Wati ===
- Category 3 severe tropical cyclone (Australian scale)
- Category 1 tropical cyclone (SSHWS)
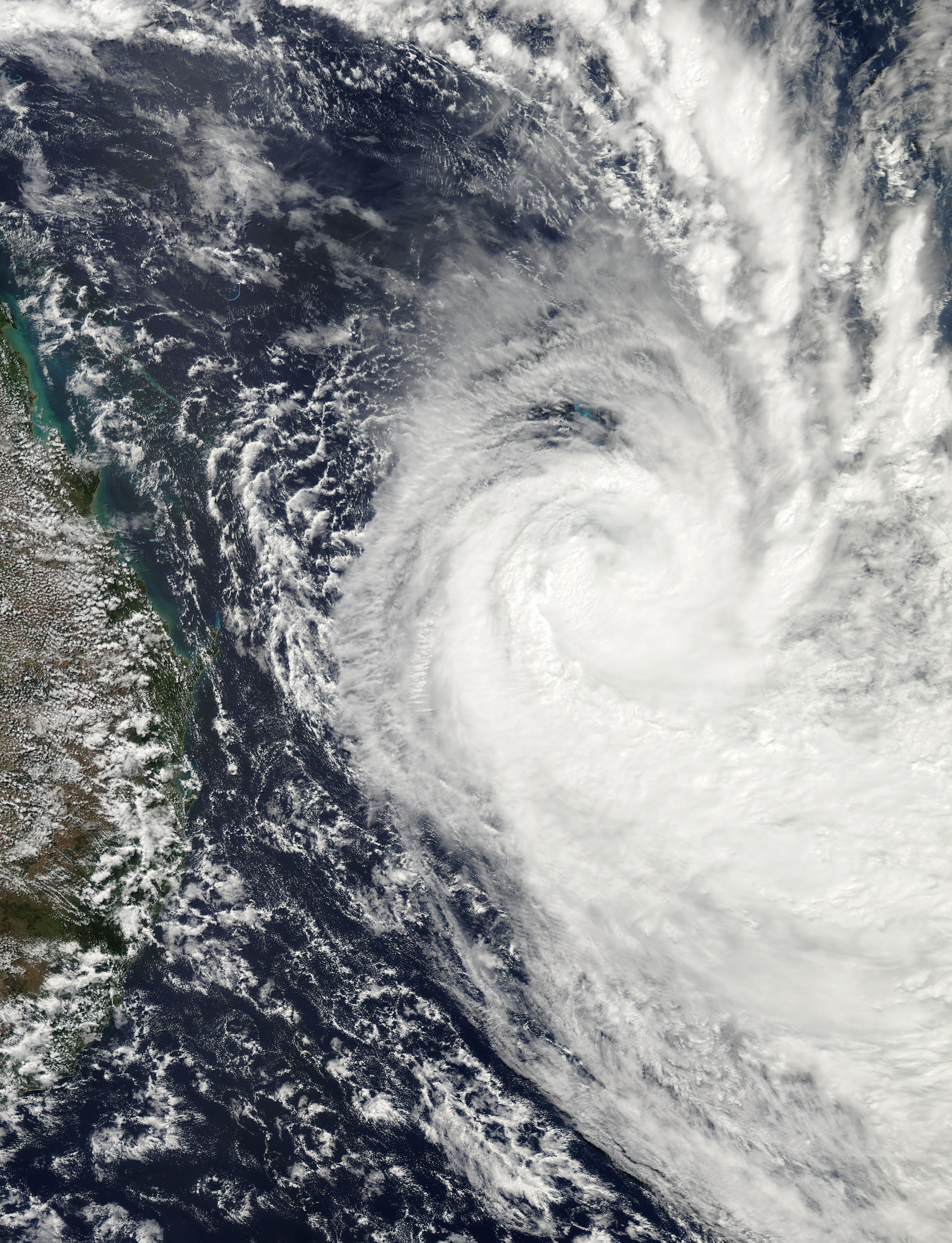
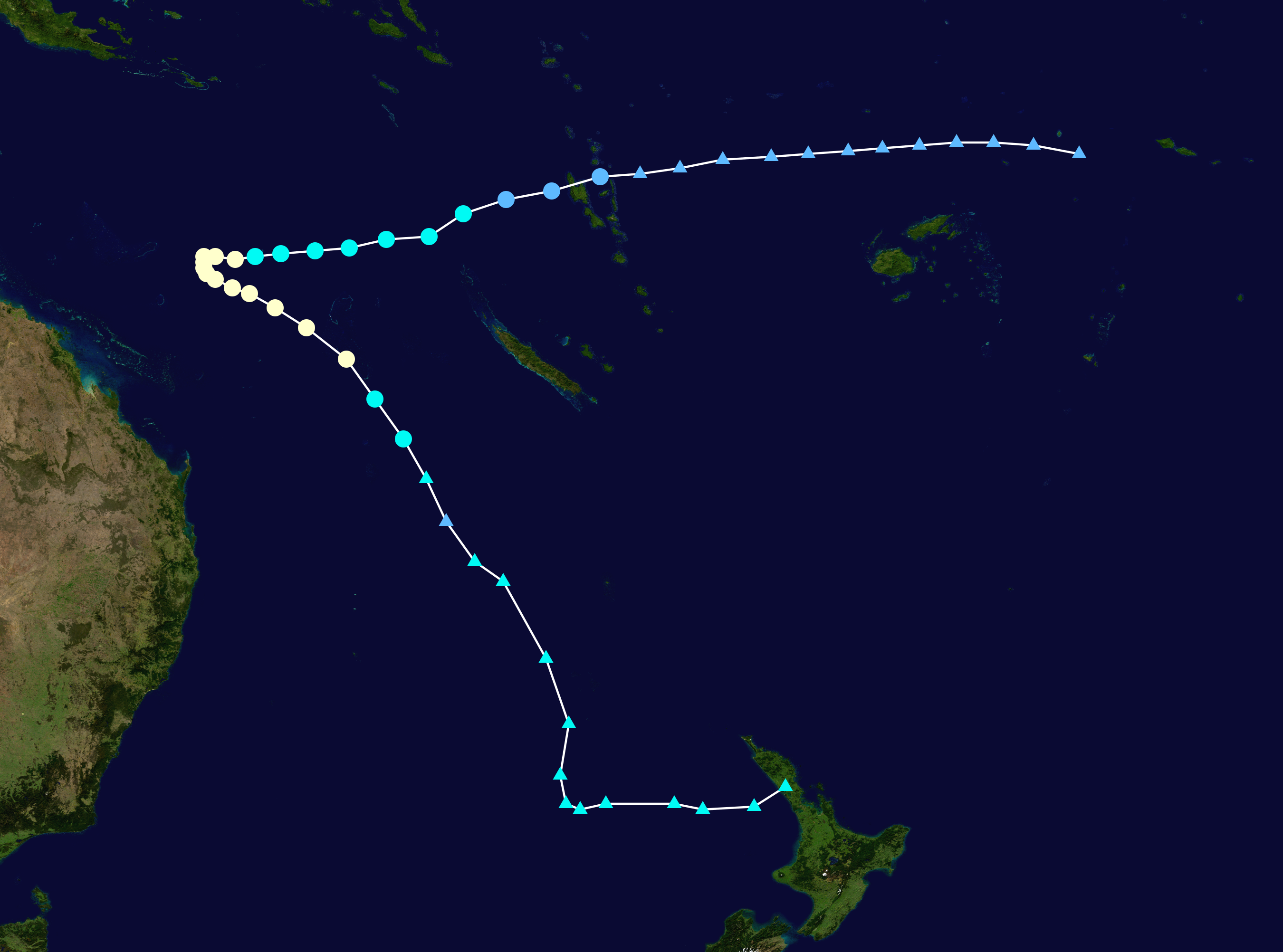
- Duration: March 17 – March 28
- Peak intensity: 140 km/h (85 mph) (10-min); 965 hPa (mbar)

Tropical Depression 16F formed on March 17 and strengthened into Tropical Cyclone Wati on March 19 north of New Caledonia. It moved westwards and slowly strengthened into a Category 3 cyclone on the Australian scale before coming to a near standstill over the Coral Sea. After remaining stationary for most of March 22, Wati took a southeasterly course on March 23, gaining speed and continuing that course on March 24. A cyclone watch was issued for Lord Howe Island and a cyclone warning was issued for Norfolk Island. Wati passed between the two islands and became extratropical on March 25.

The remains of Wati brought heavy rain and strong winds to the North Island of New Zealand on March 26, with gusts of 140 km/h reported at Cape Reinga.

=== Other systems ===
During November 30, the FMS reported that Tropical Depression 01F had developed to the southeast of American Samoa. At this time the system was poorly organized and located within a region of weak vertical wind shear, to the southeast of an upper-level outflow. Over the next couple of days, atmospheric convection surrounding the system failed to become organized and became displaced to the east and south of the center, as it moved south-eastwards into an area of increasing vertical wind shear. The system was last noted during December 2, while it was located about 155 km (95 mi) to the east of Palmerston Island in the Southern Cook Islands. During the following day, the FMS reported that Tropical Depression 02F had developed within an area of moderate vertical wind shear, about 880 km (545 mi) to the northeast of Port Vila in Vanuatu. Over the next few days, the system remained poorly organized and fairly diffused, while an upper-level trough of low pressure approached the system from the west-southwest. This trough steered the system towards the southeastwards and exposed it to strong westerly winds, before the FMS issued their final advisory on the system during December 6.

During January 30, the FMS briefly monitored Tropical Depression 09F, which was thought to be located to the north-northeast of New Caledonia. The system was being steered into an environment of increasing vertical wind shear, while atmospheric convection was active within the systems eastern quadrant and was detached from the systems center.

Tropical Depression 13F was first noted by the FMS during February 19, while it was located about 675 km (420 mi) to the southeast of Guadalcanal in the Solomon Islands.

During March 13, the FMS reported that Tropical Depression 14F had developed about 225 km (140 mi) to the southeast of Port Vila, Vanuatu. The system was slowly moving within an area of high vertical wind shear with atmospheric convection, displaced about 220 km (135 mi) to the east of the low level circulation centre. Over the next couple of days the system moved southwards and never became well organised, before it was last noted by the FMS during March 16. The precursor tropical low to Severe Tropical Cyclone Larry moved into the basin, from the Australian region and was assigned the designator 16F by the FMS during March 16. However, during that day the system recurved and moved back into the Australian region during the next day, where it later made landfall near Innisfail, Queensland and caused widespread damage to Queensland. During April 20, the FMS reported that Tropical Depression 17F had developed to the east of the International Date Line, about 500 km (310 mi) to the southeast of Suva, Fiji. Over the next day the system moved south-eastwards and remained weak and exposed, with deep convection displaced to the south and east of the low level circulation centre. The system was subsequently last noted by the FMS during April 21, as it left the tropics. During the final days of April, several depressions to the east of the International Date Line were noted by the FMS, however, none of these were referred to as tropical depressions.

== Season effects ==
Name	Dates	Peak intensity			Areas affected	Damage (USD)	Deaths	Ref(s).
Name	Dates	Category	Wind speed	Pressure	Areas affected	Damage (USD)	Deaths	Ref(s).
01F	November 30 – December 2	Tropical depression	Not specified	1004 hPa (29.65 inHg)	None	None	None	
02F	December 3–6	Tropical depression	Not specified	1002 hPa (29.59 inHg)	None	None	None	
Tam	January 6–14	Category 1 tropical cyclone	85 km/h (53 mph)	987 hPa (29.15 inHg)	American Samoa, Rotuma, Niue, Tonga, Futuna	$26,000	None	
09F	January 30	Tropical depression	Not specified	994 hPa (29.35 inHg)	None	None	None	

== See also ==
- Tropical cyclones in 2005 and 2006
- List of Southern Hemisphere tropical cyclone seasons
- Atlantic hurricane seasons: 2005, 2006
- Pacific hurricane seasons: 2005, 2006
- Pacific typhoon seasons: 2005, 2006
- North Indian Ocean cyclone seasons: 2005, 2006
