= Typhoon Virginia (1957) =

Pacific typhoon in 1957

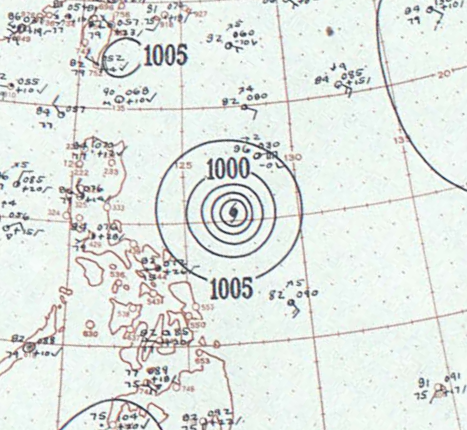

Meteorological history
- Formed: June 18, 1957
- Dissipated: June 26, 1957

Category 5-equivalent super typhoon
- 1-minute sustained (SSHWS)
- Highest winds: 280 km/h (175 mph)
- Lowest pressure: 900 hPa (mbar); 26.58 inHg

Overall effects
- Fatalities: 30
- Areas affected: Philippines; Taiwan; Japan
- Part of the 1957 Pacific typhoon season

Typhoon Virginia was a super typhoon in 1957. Forming on June 18, 1957, the storm passed near the Philippines, before making landfall directly in Taiwan. The system later dissipated near South Korea and Japan.

== Meteorological history ==
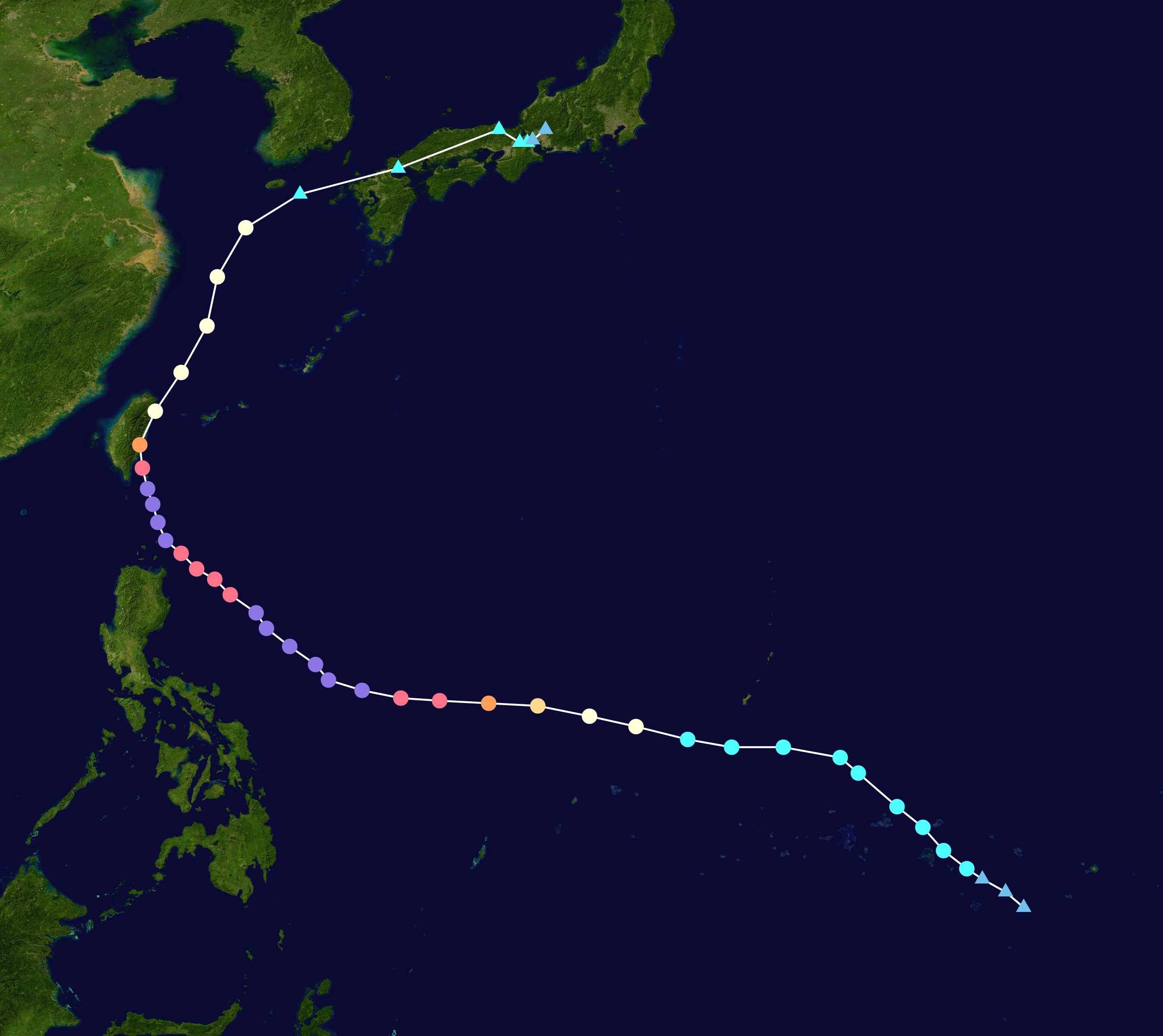
Map plotting the storm's track and intensity, according to the Saffir–Simpson scale Map key Saffir–Simpson scale Tropical depression (≤38 mph, ≤62 km/h) Tropical storm (39–73 mph, 63–118 km/h) Category 1 (74–95 mph, 119–153 km/h) Category 2 (96–110 mph, 154–177 km/h) Category 3 (111–129 mph, 178–208 km/h) Category 4 (130–156 mph, 209–251 km/h) Category 5 (≥157 mph, ≥252 km/h) Unknown Storm type Tropical cyclone Subtropical cyclone Extratropical cyclone, remnant low, tropical disturbance, or monsoon depression

Typhoon Virginia formed on June 18, 1957 and while moving northwest, the storm intensified into a tropical storm on June 19. Virginia rapidly intensified starting on June 21, and became a category 5 typhoon on June 22, with the minimum pressure of 900 hPa and winds of 273 kilometres per hour (170 mph) east of Luzon. The storm weakened to a category 4 typhoon on June 23, regaining category 5 status on the same day. The storm later affected the Philippines. On June 24, the storm weakened to a category 1 typhoon. Before weakening to a tropical storm the next day. The storm turned into an Extratropical cyclone following its weakening. The later storm dissipated on June 27 between South Korea and Japan.

=== Analysis ===
The development of Typhoon Virginia was described as "type 2 development" (referencing the initial graduality of intensification, followed by rapid deepening), along with Typhoon Anita of 1970. A scan taken of the typhoon as an extratropical system saw some sort of "echo pattern" within the system.

== Preparations and impact ==
Taiwan was severely affected by the storm, with multiple deaths and missing people. The storm affected the Japanese areas of Kyushu and Kantō. The storm killed 30 people, with 23 people deemed missing. 33 people were also injured, with 396 houses being destroyed. Other than housing damages and human fatalities, the storm destroyed 14 ships. Floods created from the storm were noted in southern Japanese areas, affecting 150,000 people. The Taiwanese government allocated 100,000 New Taiwan dollars to relief works and survivors.
