= 2006 North Indian Ocean cyclone season =

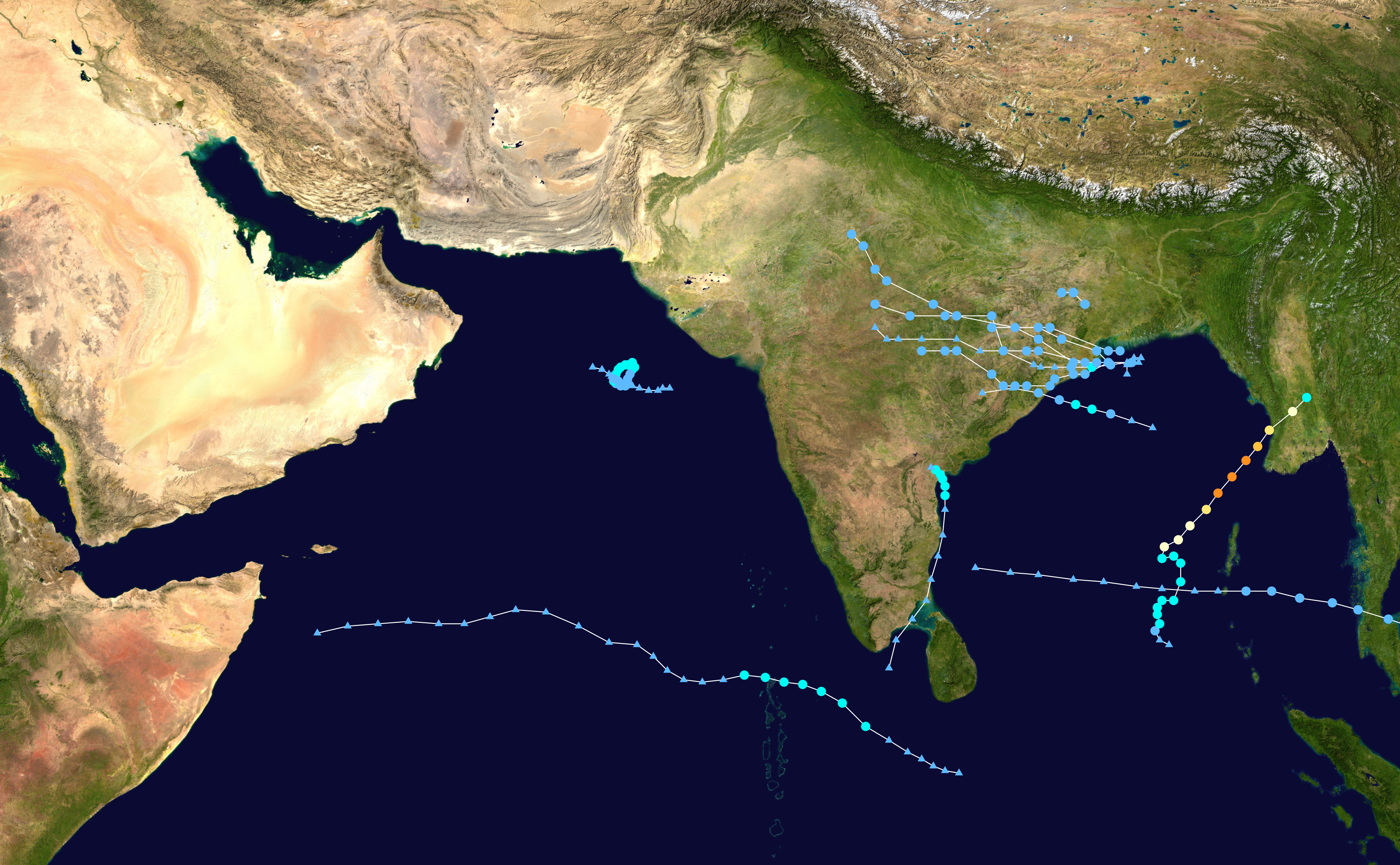
- Season summary map

Seasonal boundaries
- First system formed: January 13, 2006
- Last system dissipated: October 30, 2006 (Officially); December 7, 2006 (Unofficially)

Strongest storm
- Name: Mala
  - Maximum winds: 185 km/h (115 mph) (3-minute sustained)
  - Lowest pressure: 954 hPa (mbar)

Seasonal statistics
- Depressions: 12, 1 unofficial
- Deep depressions: 6, 1 unofficial
- Cyclonic storms: 3
- Severe cyclonic storms: 2
- Very severe cyclonic storms: 1
- Extremely severe cyclonic storms: 1
- Total fatalities: 623 total
- Total damage: At least $6.7 million (2006 USD)

Related articles
- 2006 Atlantic hurricane season; 2006 Pacific hurricane season; 2006 Pacific typhoon season

The 2006 North Indian Ocean cyclone season had no bounds, but cyclones tend to form between April and December, with peaks in May and November. These dates conventionally delimit the period of each year when most tropical cyclones form in the northern Indian Ocean.

The scope of this basin is north of the Equator and west of the Malay Peninsula. The IMD and JTWC monitor this basin. This basin is divided in two seas by India, the Bay of Bengal and Arabian Sea, abbreviated BOB and ARB, respectively.

Although an inactive year, 2006 had more of note than previous years like 2005 or 2004. Cyclone Mala caused severe damage and killed 22 when it hit Burma as a cat. 3. An unnamed depression killed over 100 in India, and cyclonic storm Ogni caused minor effects in India as well. Additionally, the remnants of Typhoon Durian crossed the Malay Peninsula causing minor effects, but was a rare basin-crosser in this area.

== Season summary ==
Overall activity across the North Indian Ocean during 2006 was slightly below-average, with 12 depressions, 3 cyclonic storms, and 1 very severe cyclonic storm. An average season, according to the IMD, consists of 15 depressions and 5–6 cyclonic storms. In addition to the storms monitored by the IMD, the JTWC also tracked the remnants of Typhoon Durian across the Malay Peninsula into the Andaman Sea as a tropical depression in early December. The majority of storms formed within the Bay of Bengal, with only two existing in the Arabian Sea. Activity peaked during the summer due to an active southwest monsoon.

Starting in May, the seasonal monsoon developed over the Bay of Bengal and advanced northwestward over India where it propagated through September. During this period the system spawned numerous disturbances, nine of which became tropical cyclones. All but one of these systems formed in the northern Bay of Bengal and struck Odisha before spreading rain across large portions of India. The outlier was Severe Cyclonic Storm Mukda in late September which remained virtually stationary its entire existence to the southwest of Gujarat. The combined effects of the eight other depressions along with the monsoon itself caused disastrous flooding throughout India. By early August, nearly 500,000 people were evacuated in Mumbai due to rising waters. The collective effects of the depressions alone resulted in at least 562 fatalities with hundreds more attributed to the monsoon rains. More than 1 million people across Odisha were left homeless from the storms.

During periods of cyclonic activity, rainfall associated with the monsoon was above-average as a whole. Departures from average reached 13.8%, 26.2%, 28.1%, 9.8%, and 11.5% for the periods of July 5–12 (BOB 02), August 2–9 (BOB 03), August 9–16 (BOB 04), September 20–27 (Land 01 and Mukda), and September 27–October 5 (BOB 08), respectively. In contrast to the notable activity of the monsoon in respect to tropical cyclone formation, rainfall from the monsoon across India was predominantly below-average due to poor distribution of rain. Of the four broadly defined regions of India used by the IMD, only Central India experienced above-average rainfall, possibly due to the multiple cyclones that passed through the region. This area received an average of 1,152.2 mm (45.36 in) of rain between June and September, while the average is 993.9 mm (39.13 in). In addition, five sub-divisions (the Andaman and Nicobar Islands, Arunachal Pradesh, Assam and Meghalaya, west Uttar Pradesh, and Haryana) experienced drought conditions.

== Systems ==
=== Deep Depression ARB 01 ===
- Deep depression (IMD)
- Tropical storm (SSHWS)
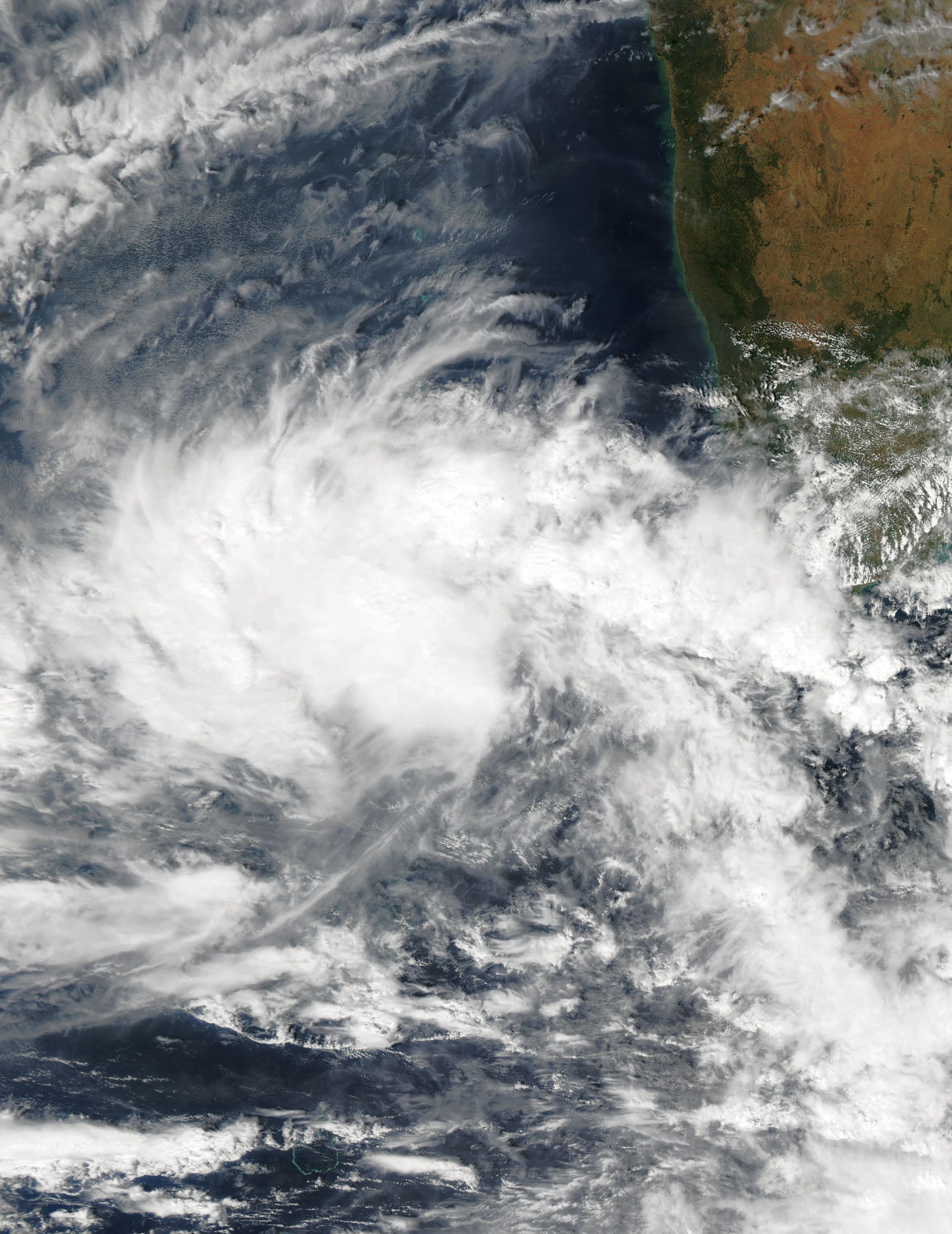
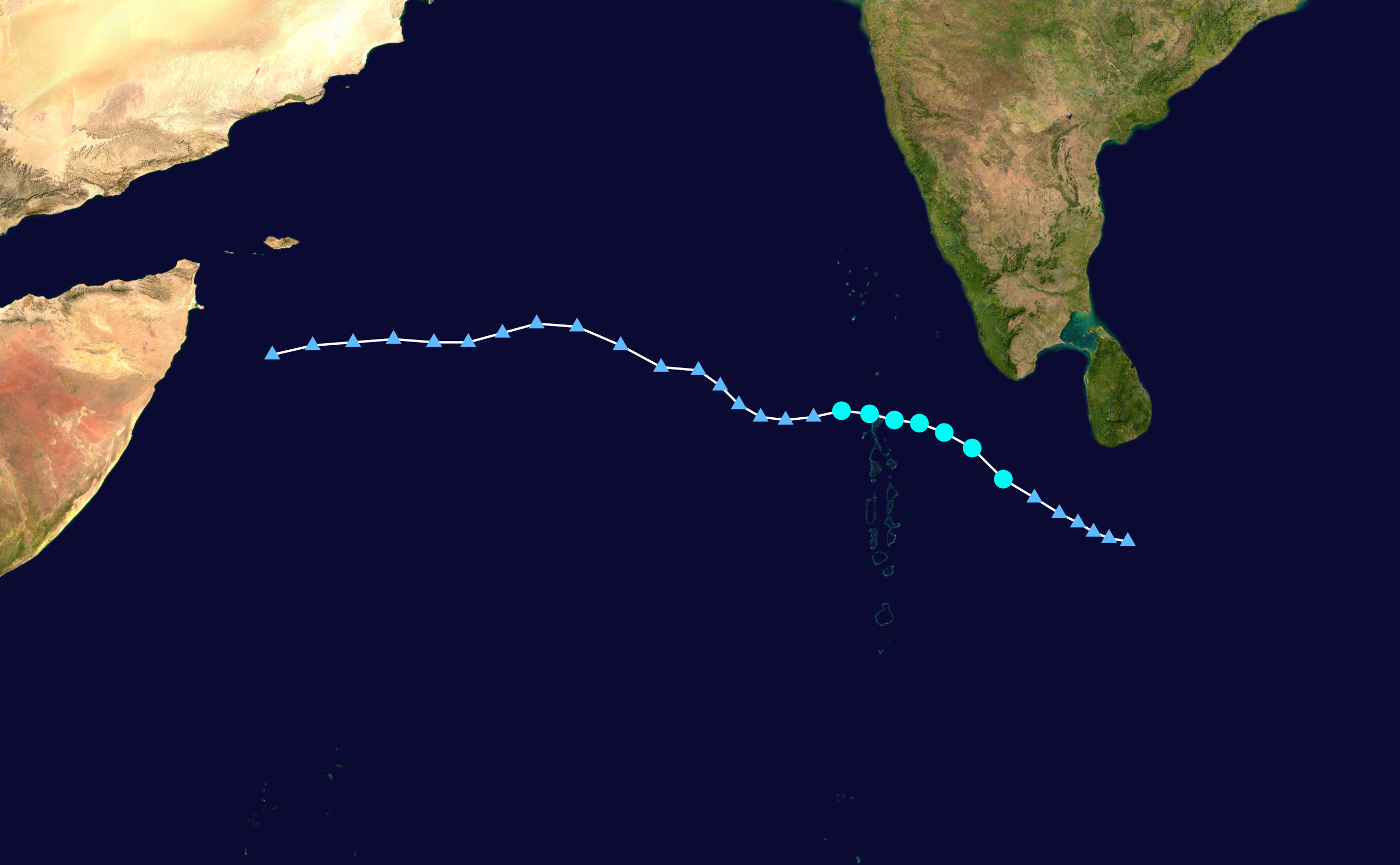
- Duration: January 13 – January 14
- Peak intensity: 55 km/h (35 mph) (3-min); 1004 hPa (mbar)

The first system of the year was a rare January system. It originated from an area of convection south of Sri Lanka, located in an area of low wind shear. The thunderstorms increased as outflow improved. On January 13, the IMD classified the system as a depression south of the southernmost point of India. The system moved west-northwestward into the southeastern Arabian Sea. Late that day, the JTWC classified the system as Tropical Cyclone 01A. Early on January 14, the IMD upgraded the system to a deep depression, estimating peak 3 minute winds of 55 km/h (35 mph). The JTWC estimated stronger winds of 85 km/h (55 mph), or tropical storm status. Subsequently, the circulation became disorganized and convection dwindled due to increased wind shear, although its outskirts brought light rainfall to southwest India. Around 00:00 UTC on January 15, the system degenerated into a remnant low. The remnants continued westward across the Arabian Sea, dissipating completely on January 19.

=== Extremely Severe Cyclonic Storm Mala ===
- Extremely severe cyclonic storm (IMD)
- Category 4 tropical cyclone (SSHWS)
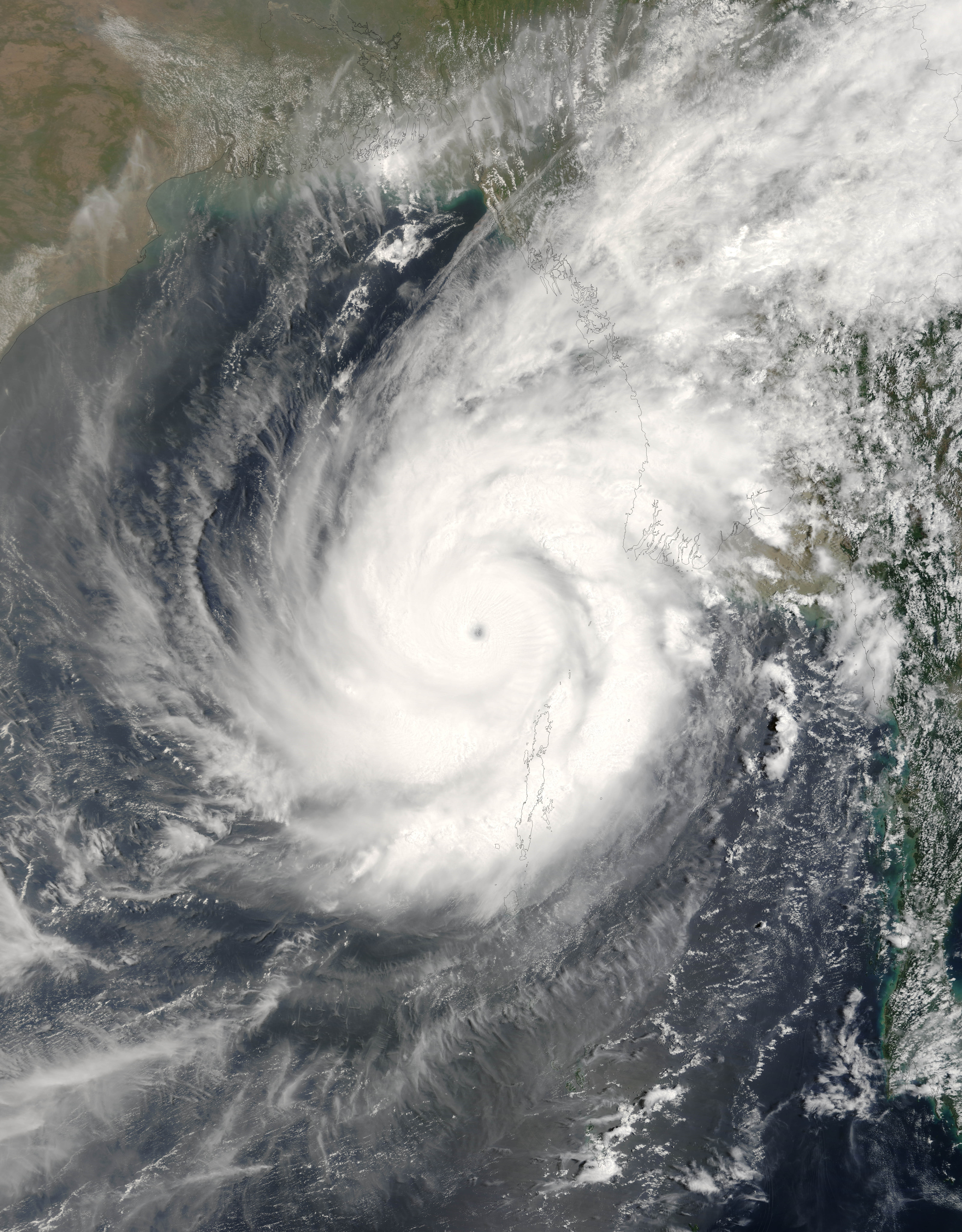
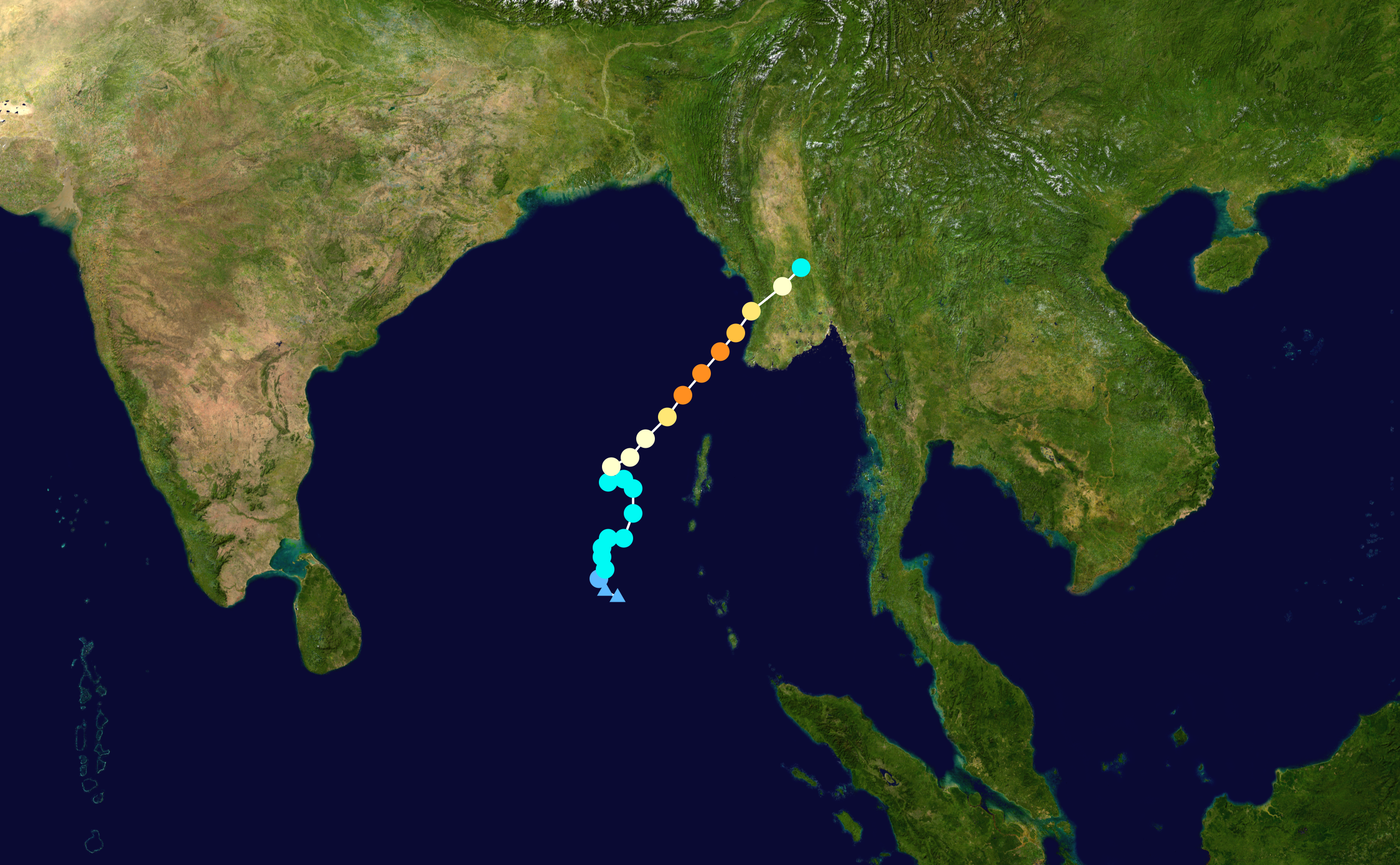
- Duration: April 25 – April 29
- Peak intensity: 185 km/h (115 mph) (3-min); 954 hPa (mbar)

In mid-April, an area of disturbed weather formed over the southern Bay of Bengal and nearby Andaman Sea. Over a period of several days, the system became increasingly organized and was classified as a depression on April 24. Situated within a region of weak steering currents, the storm slowly intensified as it drifted in a general northward direction. It attained gale-force winds and was named Mala the next day. (Note: The name Mala (Sinhala: මාලා, [maːlaː]) was contributed by Sri Lanka and means "garland, wreath of flowers" in Sinhala.) Conditions for strengthening improved markedly on April 27 and Mala subsequently underwent rapid intensification. Subsequently, the cyclone attained its peak intensity. Early on April 28, the cyclone had estimated winds of 185 km/h (115 mph) and a barometric pressure of 954 mbar (hPa; 28.17 inHg). The JTWC considered Mala to have been slightly stronger, classifying it as a Category 4-equivalent cyclone. Steady weakening ensued thereafter and the storm made landfall in Myanmar's Rakhine State on April 29. Rapid dissipation took place after it made landfall and Mala was last noted early the next morning.

In contrast to Mala's intensity, damage was relatively minimal across Myanmar due to adequate early warnings, while timely and effective evacuations minimized loss of life along the coast. The greatest damage resulted from a thunderstorm near Yangon on April 28 that spawned a possible tornado in an industrial zone. A total of 586 homes were damaged there. Just outside the city in the Hinthada District, a flash flood killed at least 18 people. Overall, the storm claimed 37 lives in the country and left US$6.7 million in damage. In the wake of Mala, the Red Cross distributed relief aid to affected residents while local officials set up shelters to house those left homeless. Government and social organizations donated 5.4 million kyat (US$4,320) in cash to survivors in the Ayeyarwady Region.

=== Deep Depression BOB 02 ===
- Deep depression (IMD)
- Tropical storm (SSHWS)
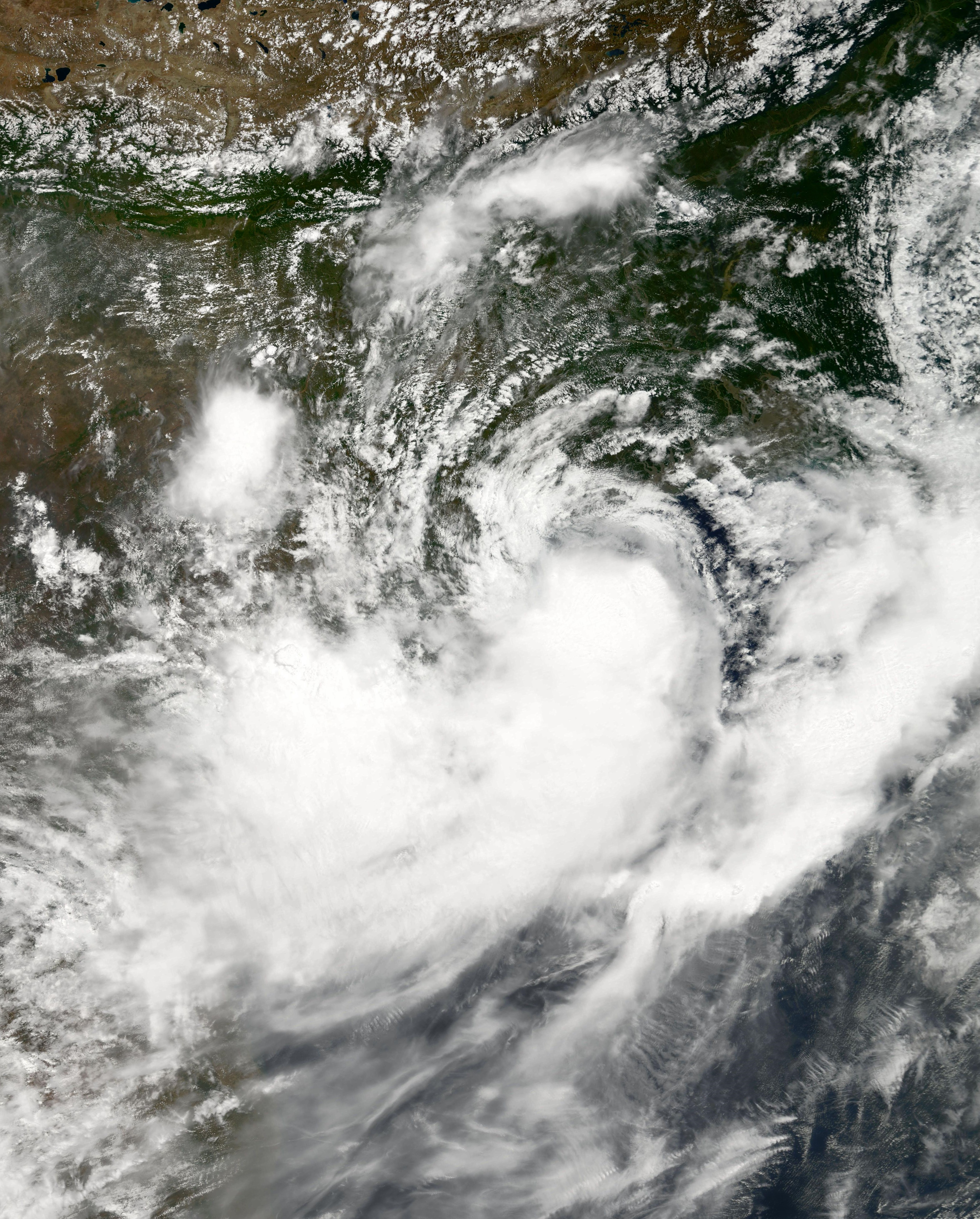
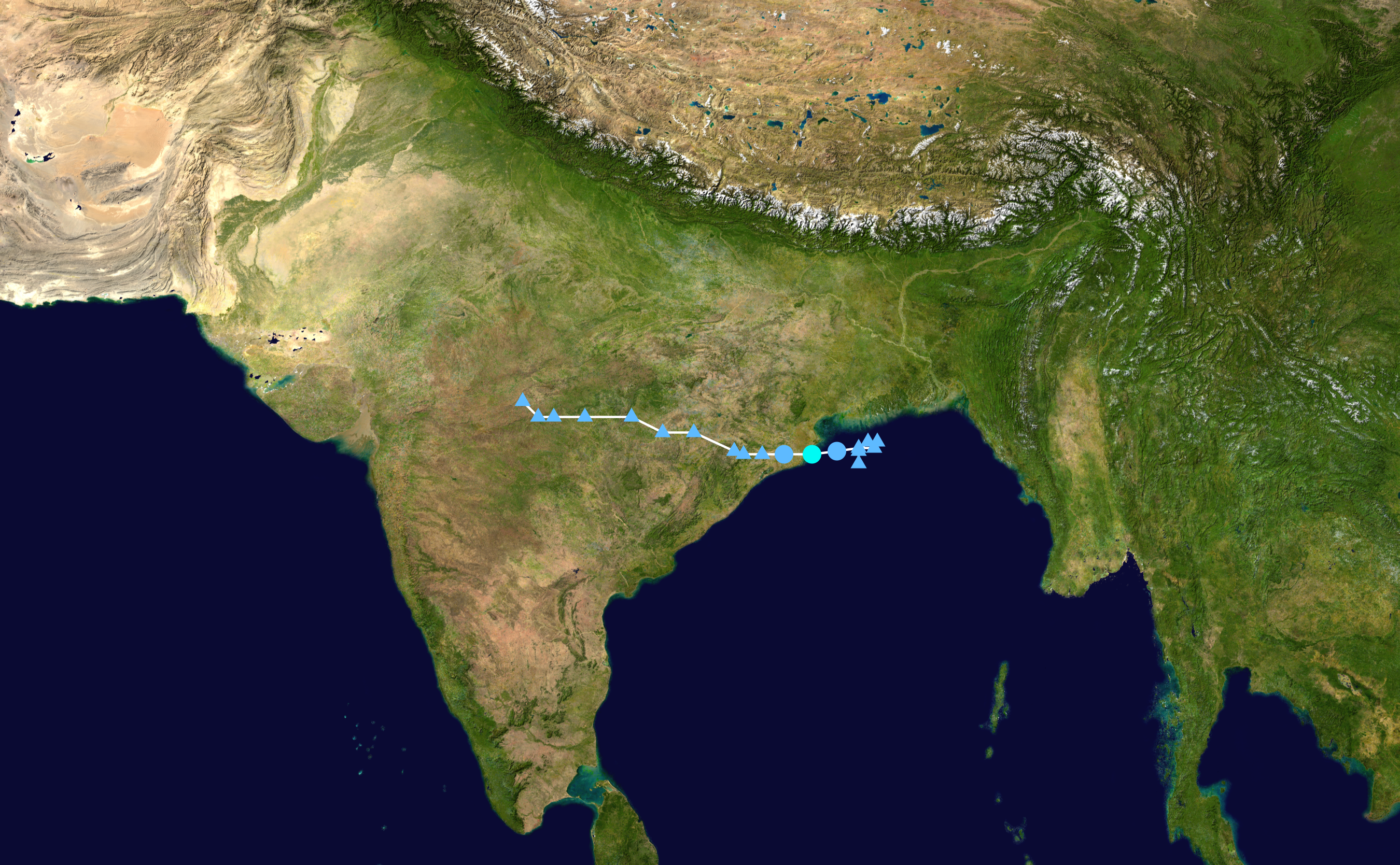
- Duration: July 2 – July 5
- Peak intensity: 55 km/h (35 mph) (3-min); 982 hPa (mbar)

In late June, an area of disturbed weather persisted over the northern Bay of Bengal, unusually far south for a monsoonal system for this time of year. Convergence from the monsoon enhanced convection to the southwest of a developing low-pressure area; however, strong wind shear was expected to prevent tropical cyclogenesis. However, the system rapidly organized into a deep depression by July 2, at which time it was situated 240 km (150 mi) south of Calcutta, India. At 1200 UTC, the JTWC classified the cyclone as a tropical storm with one-minute sustained winds of 65 km/h (40 mph). This marked only the second time since 1981 that the JTWC had monitored a July storm with gale-force winds in the basin. Weak steering currents prompted the a slow, westward track and just three hours later, the cyclone made landfall between Paradeep and Chandabali in Odisha. A pressure of 982 mb (hPa; 29.00 inHg), the lowest in relation to the storm, was measured in Bhubaneswar as the deep depression moved through. Once onshore, steady weakening took place and the depression ultimately degenerated into a remnant low on July 5 over Vidarbha.

Owing to the cyclone's monsoonal nature, it produced heavy rains across a large swath of India and encompassed both coastlines. The heaviest rains fell in Odisha and Gujarat, with many areas receiving over 300 mm (12 in). A two-day total of 630 mm (25 in) was measured in the Nabarangpur district and many nearby areas reported over 500 mm (20 in). Ahwa, Gujarat, recorded the greatest single-day total of 390 mm (15 in), and received at least 540 mm (21 in) during the entire event. The hardest hit areas were Odisha and Vidarbha, where 36 and 41 people were killed, respectively. At least five of the deaths were from fishermen who drowned offshore while the others resulted from landslides or building collapses. In the nearby states, Andhra Pradesh, Jharkhand, Karnataka, a further 30 people were killed collectively from flooding and mudslides. The normally slow-moving Saglana River burst its banks in Bhavnagar, Gujarat, and left most of the city submerged. Several homes collapsed and power supply became erratic. At least two people lost their lives in the city. A further 24 people were killed in the Navsari district after two rivers flooded surrounding areas.

=== Depression BOB 07 ===
- Depression (IMD)
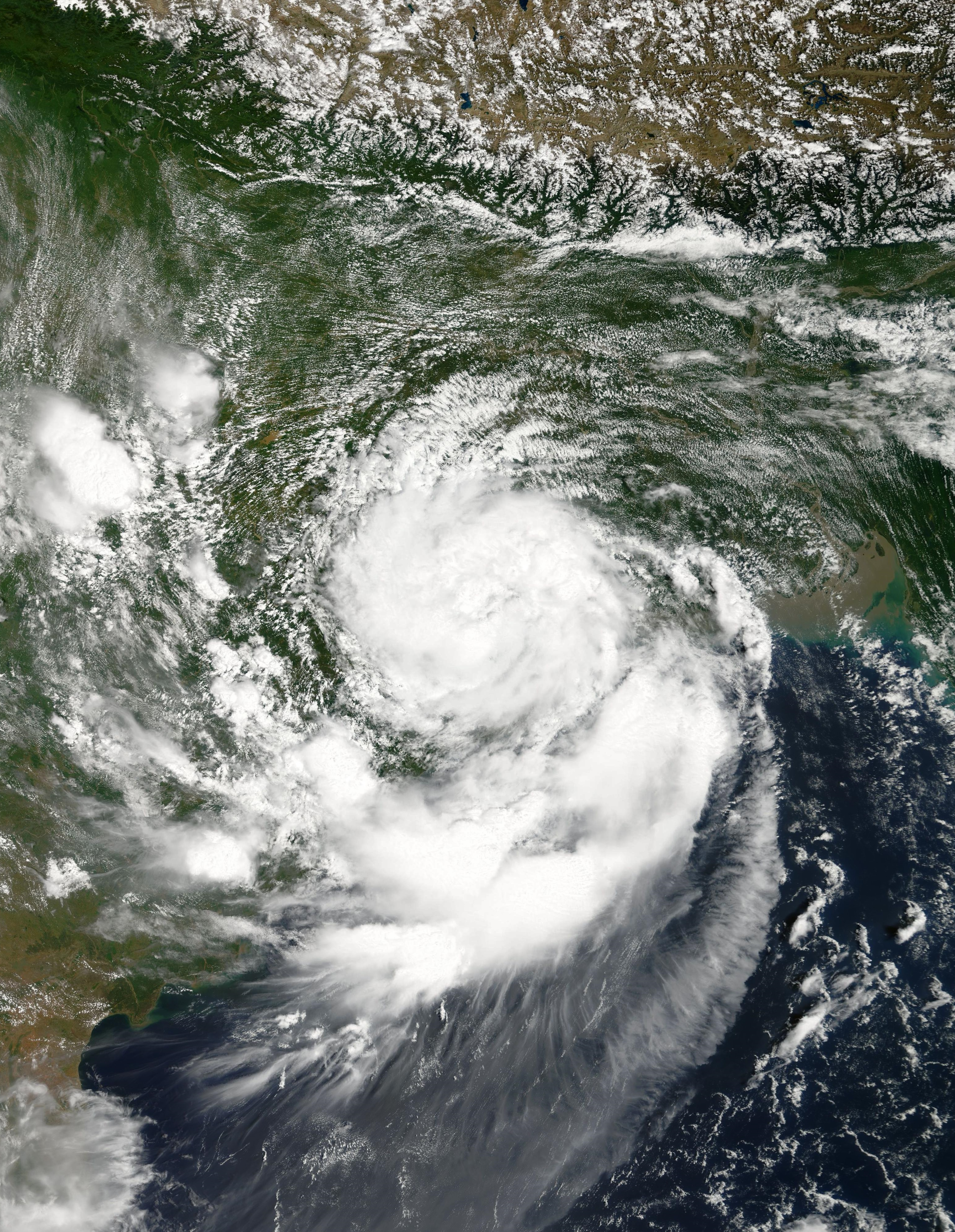
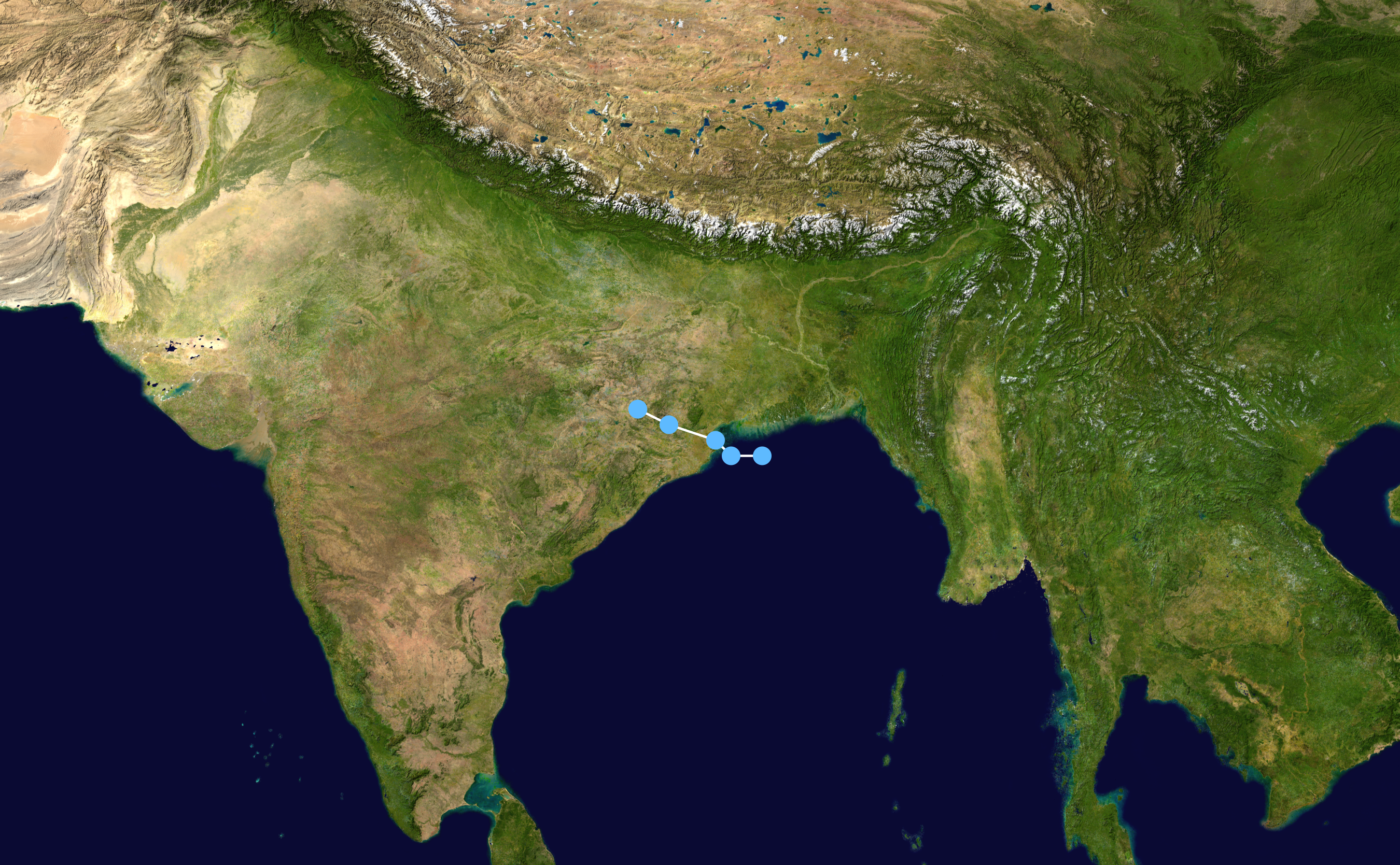
- Duration: September 3 – September 4
- Peak intensity: 45 km/h (30 mph) (3-min); 992 hPa (mbar)

A low-pressure area formed over northwest Bay of Bengal on 2 September. It concentrated into a depression the next day and crossed the north Orissa coast near Chandbali in the early morning of 4 September. Govindpur in Orissa recorded 150 mm of rainfall on 4 September.

=== Land Depression 01 ===
- Depression (IMD)
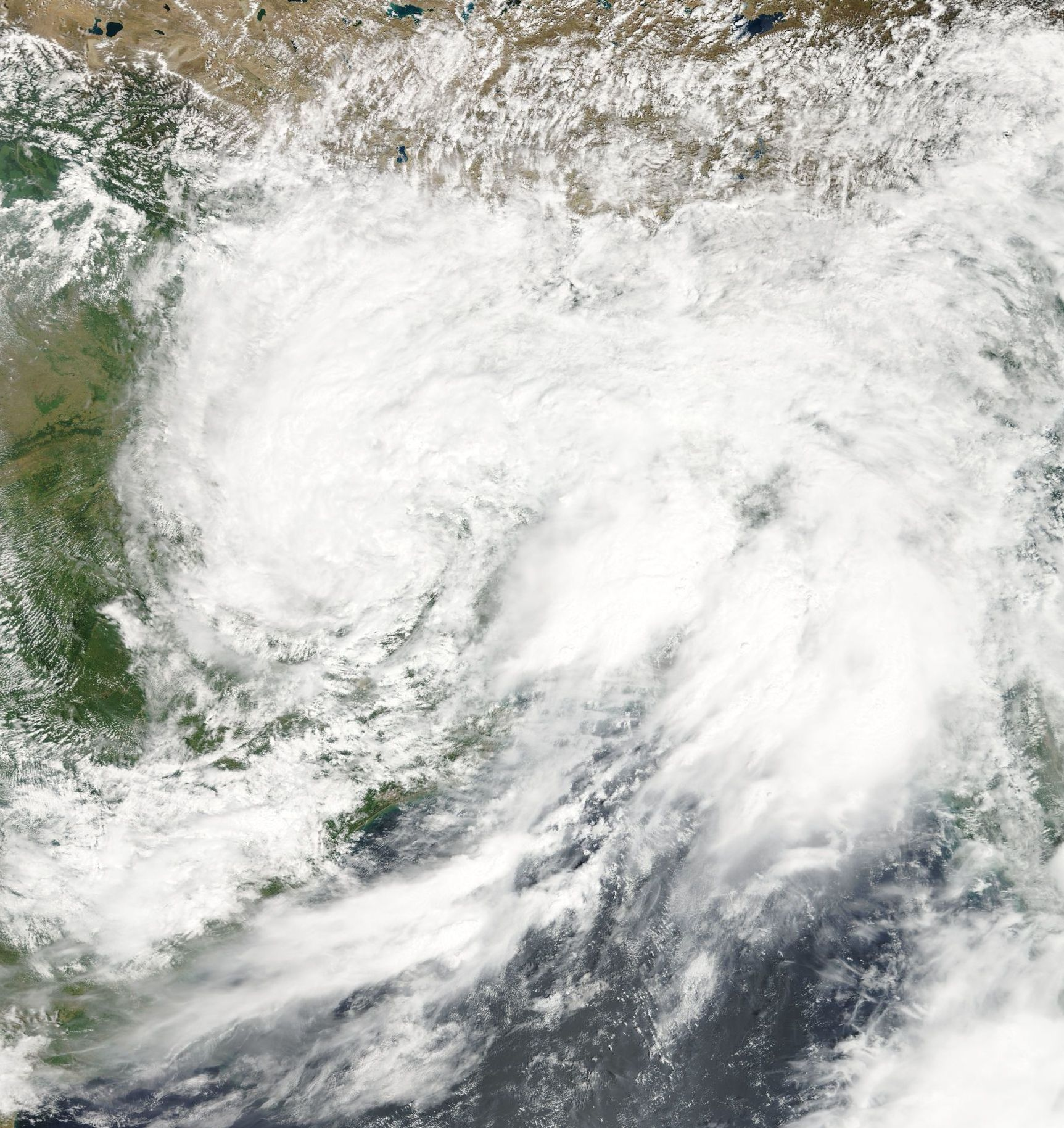
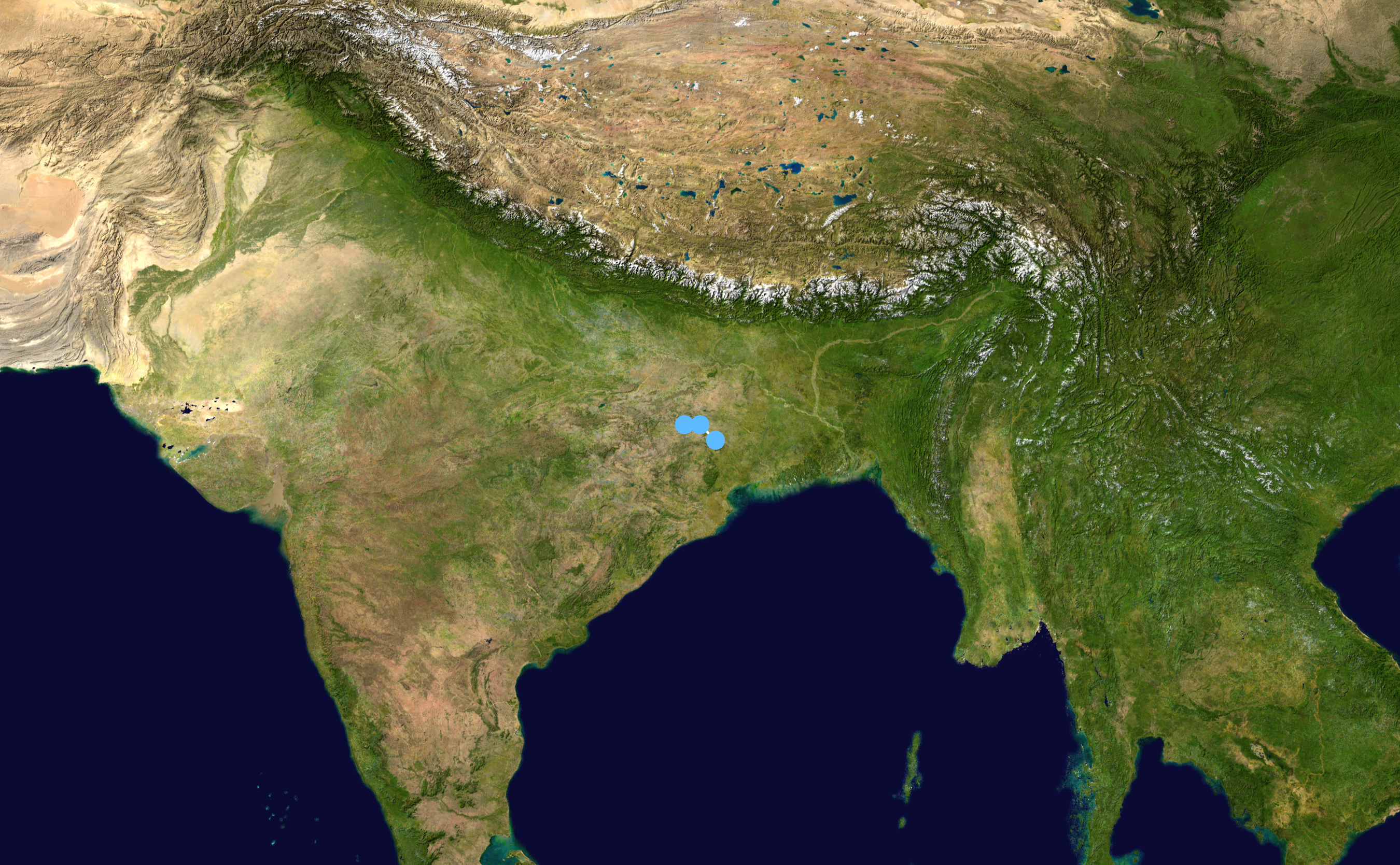
- Duration: September 21 – September 24
- Peak intensity: 45 km/h (30 mph) (3-min); 996 hPa (mbar)

The India Meteorological Department upgraded a well-marked low-pressure area near Jamshedpur, India to a land depression with a minimum central pressure of 996hPa and maximum sustained winds of 25 knots (46 km/h) on September 21. The United States Naval Research Laboratory previously monitored the system as an area of interest before it moved inland near the border of India and Bangladesh. The depression degenerated into a low-pressure area on September 24 and dissipated later that day. Torrential downpours caused flooding that killed more than 170 people and left around 375,000 homeless in eastern India and Bangladesh. Tantloi in West Bengal received 370 mm of rainfall in 48 hours between 22 and 23 September.

=== Severe Cyclonic Storm Mukda ===
- Severe cyclonic storm (IMD)
- Tropical storm (SSHWS)
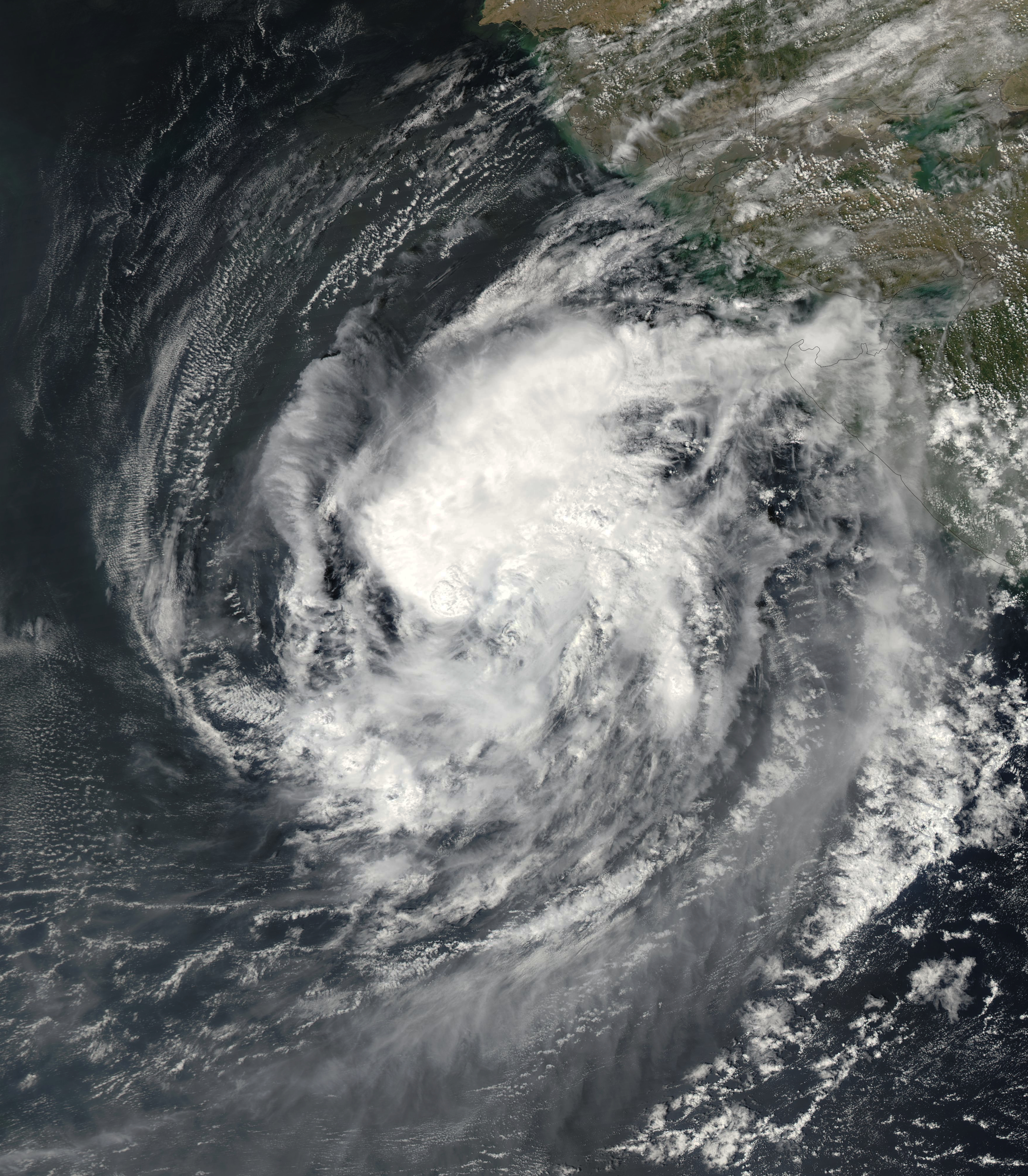
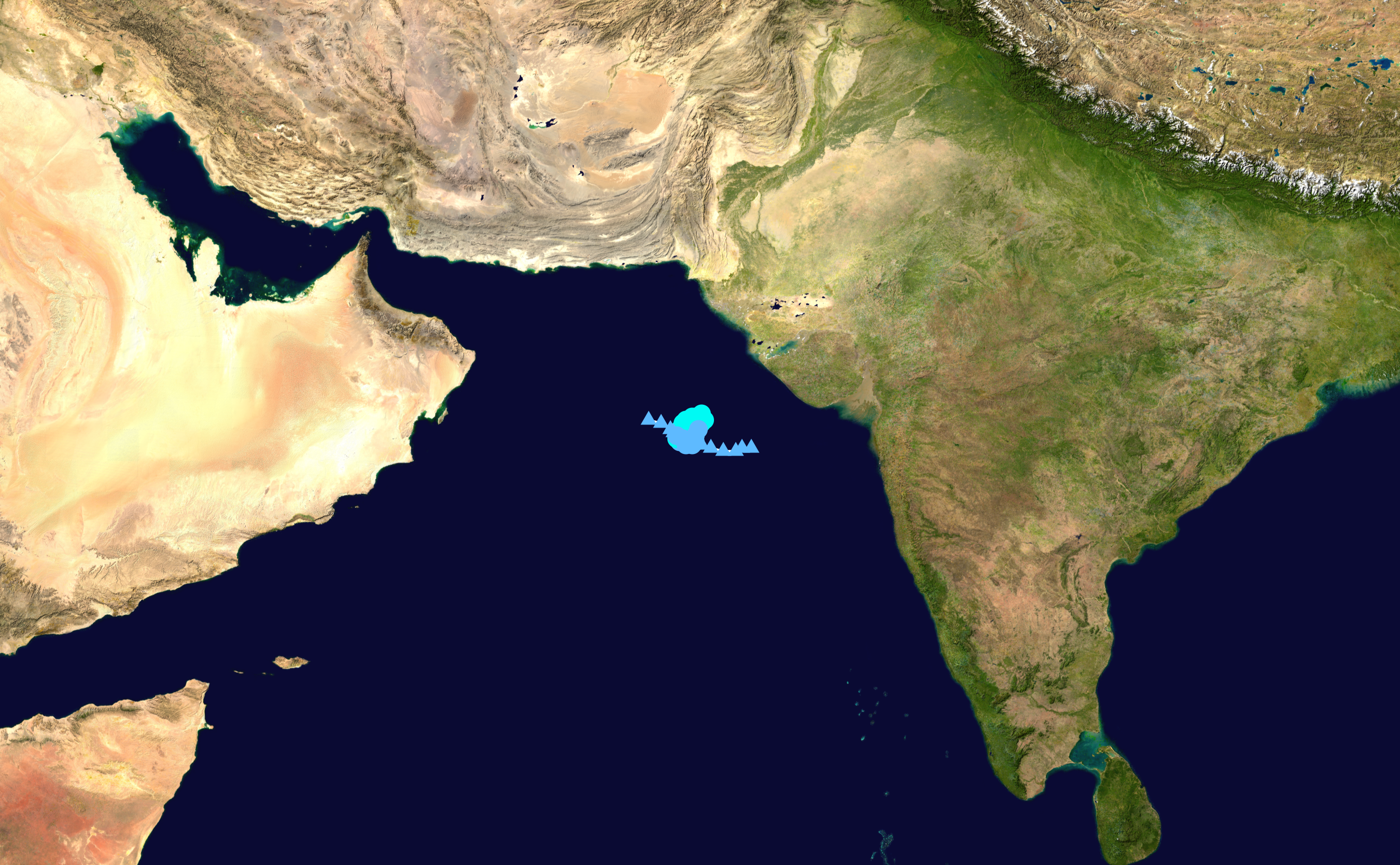
- Duration: September 21 – September 24
- Peak intensity: 100 km/h (65 mph) (3-min); 988 hPa (mbar)

An area of convection persisted west of India on September 18 within a broad trough. Low wind shear allowed for gradual organization as the system moved westward. The thunderstorms organized about an exposed circulation. Early on September 21, the IMD classified it as a depression about 450 km (280 mi) southwest of Porbandar, Gujarat. Around the same time, the JTWC began issuing warnings on the system as Tropical Cyclone 04A. The system remained nearly stationary and quickly organized. By 12:00 UTC on September 22, the IMD had upgraded it to a severe cyclonic storm, naming it Mukda. (Note: The name Mukda (Thai: มุกดา, [muk̚˦˥ daː˧]) was contributed by Thailand and means "pearl" in Thai.) Three hours later, the agency estimated peak 3 minute winds of 100 km/h (60 mph). By that time, Mukda had developed an eye-feature in the center of the convection, although it failed to organize further.

The storm initially drifted toward Gujarat, bringing isolated heavy rainfall along the coastline; Upleta received 170 mm (6.7 in) during the storm's passage. However, Mukda steadily weakened while remaining nearly stationary. Late on September 24, the system degenerated into a remnant low. The remnants turned westward, maintaining a distinct circulation and occasionally redeveloping thunderstorms, but failing to reorganize.

=== Depression BOB 08 ===
- Depression (IMD)
- Tropical storm (SSHWS)
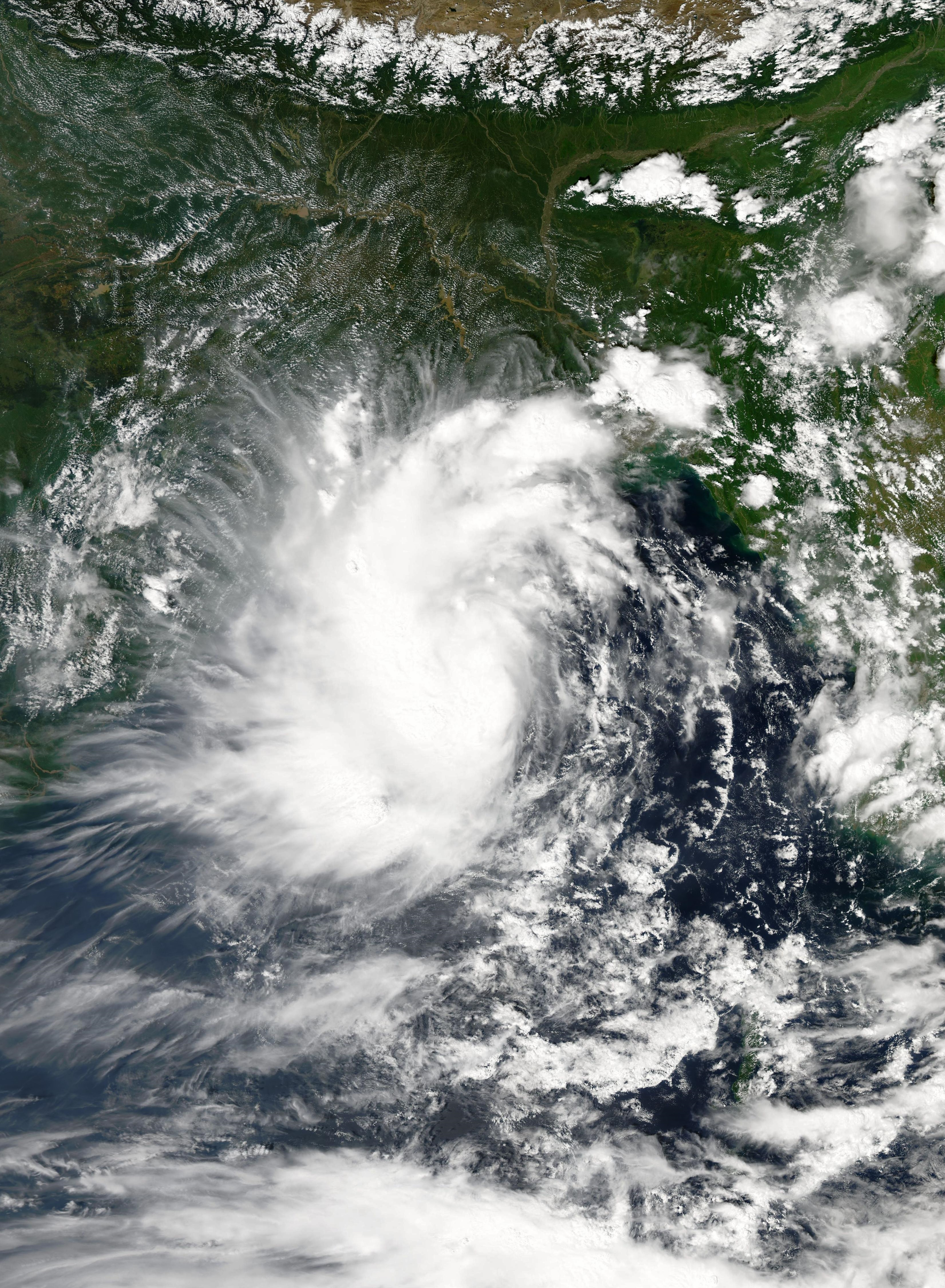
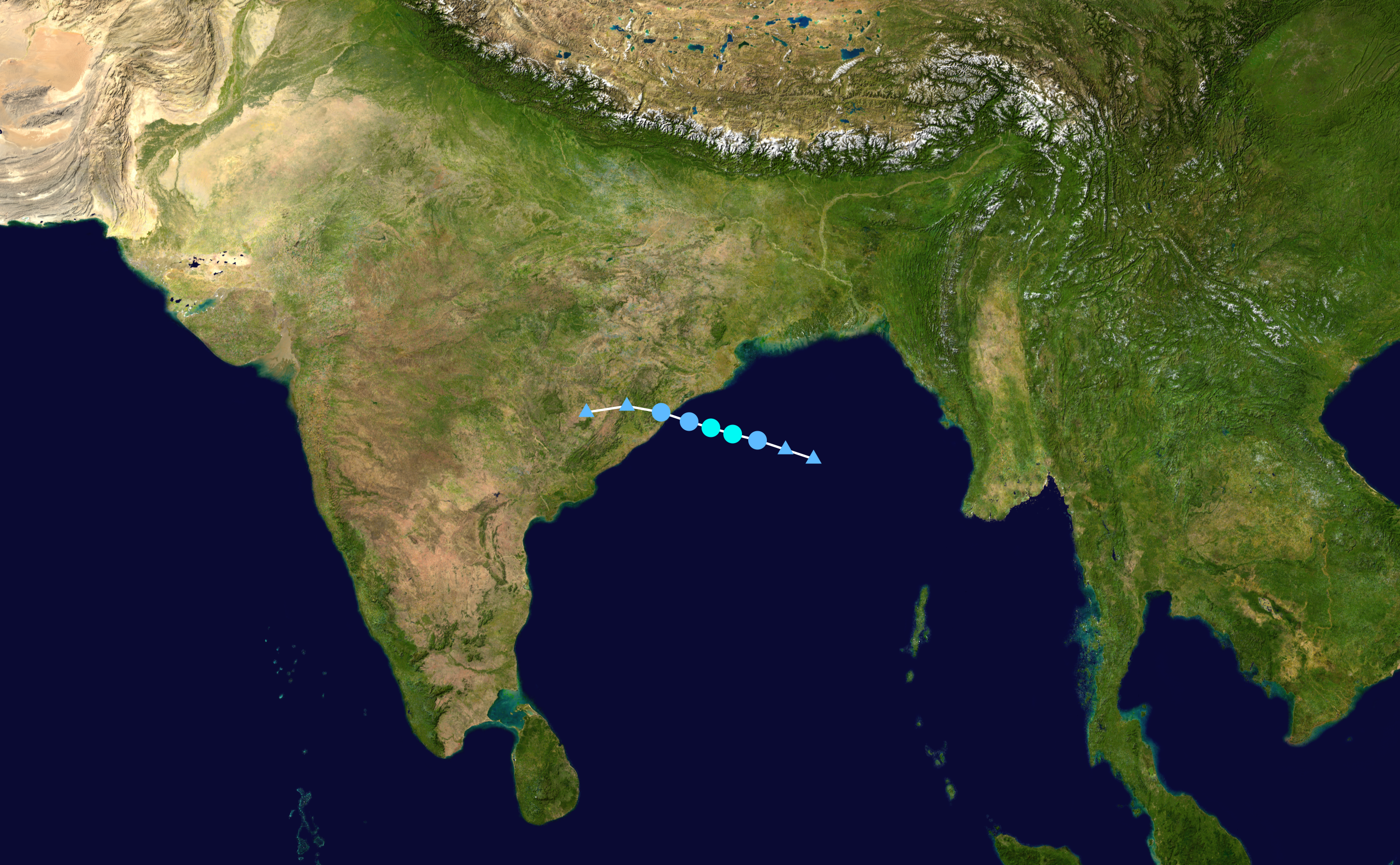
- Duration: September 28 – September 30
- Peak intensity: 45 km/h (30 mph) (3-min); 1002 hPa (mbar)

Tropical Cyclone 05B formed on September 28 approximately 250 nautical miles (460 km) south of Kolkata, India. It made landfall on September 29 near Gopalpur, Odisha before dissipating overland. Mahendragarh in Orissa received 170 mm of rainfall on 30 September.

=== Cyclonic Storm Ogni ===
- Cyclonic storm (IMD)
- Tropical storm (SSHWS)
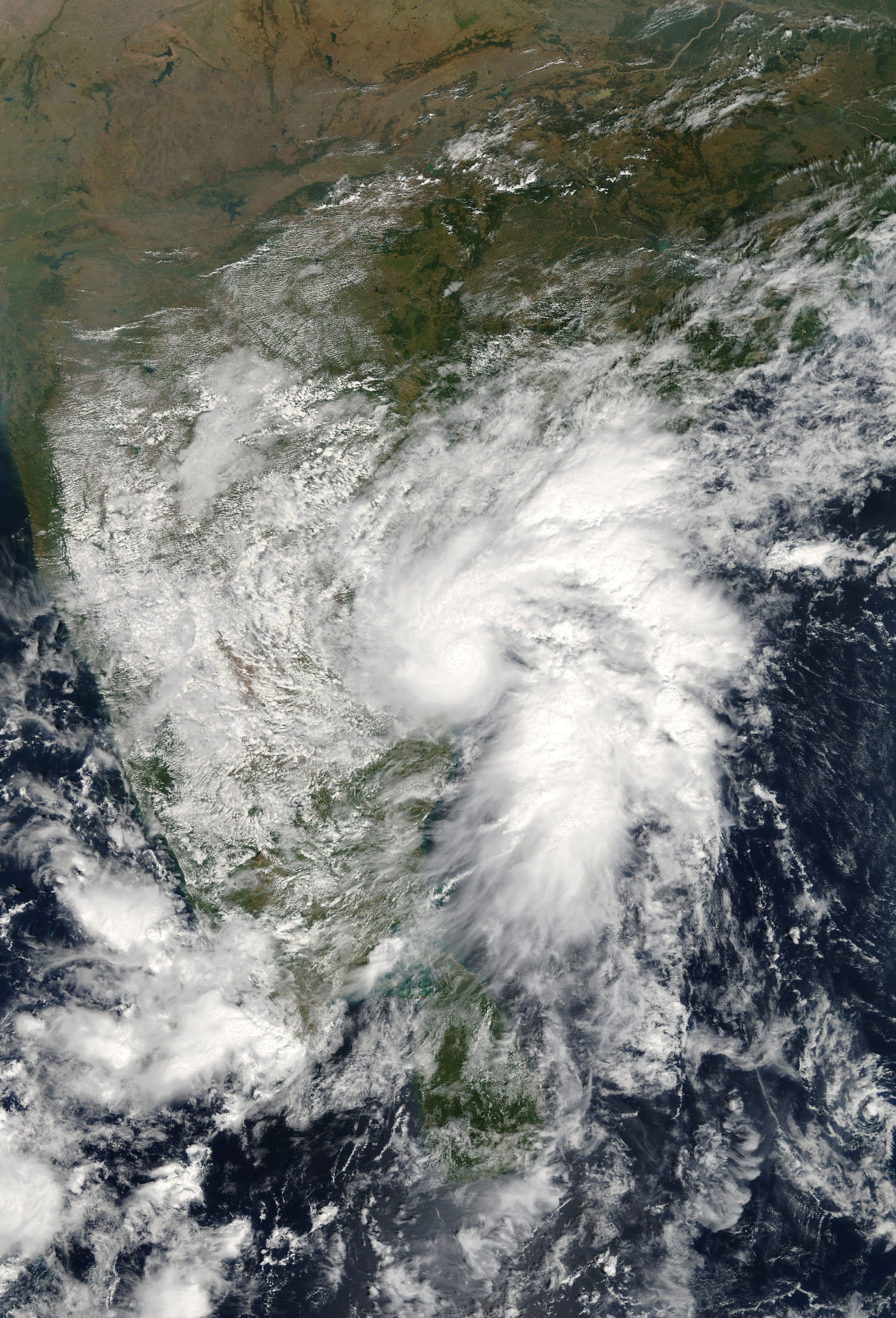
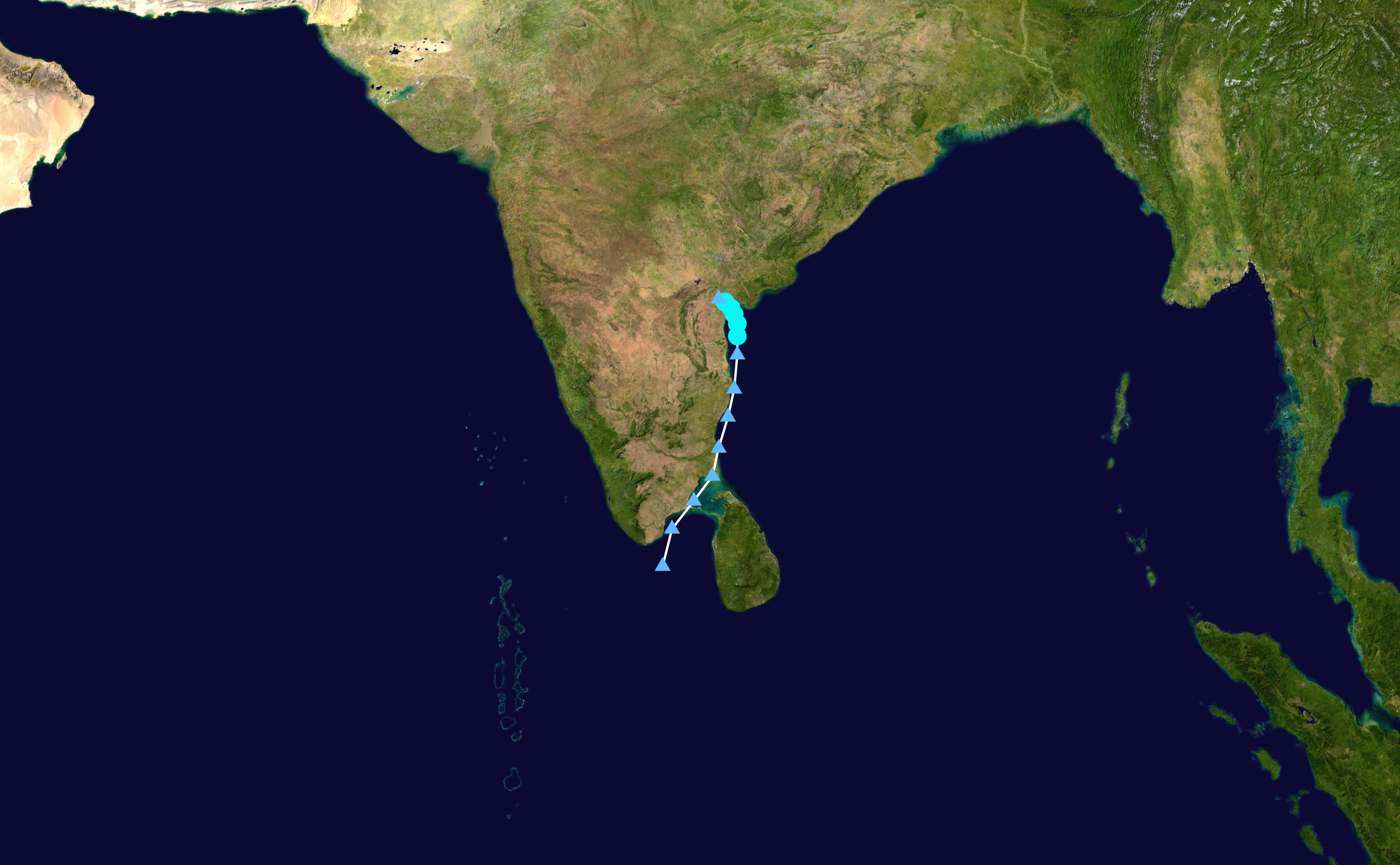
- Duration: October 29 – October 30
- Peak intensity: 65 km/h (40 mph) (3-min); 998 hPa (mbar)

On October 27, an area of convection formed west of Sri Lanka, spawning a circulation in the Palk Strait on the next day. With low to moderate wind shear, the system's convection organized and developed outflow. Early on October 29, a depression developed just east of India's southeast coast. It quickly intensified while moving parallel to the coastline, becoming Cyclonic Storm Ogni later that day with peak 3 minute winds of 65 km/h (40 mph). (Note: The name Ogni (Bengali: অগ্নি, [ˈoɡ.niˑ]) was contributed by Bangladesh and means "fire" in Bengali.) Conditions favored development, with the exception of proximity to land. The JTWC issued a Tropical Cyclone Formation Alert on October 29, and although at the time they did not classify the system, the agency upgraded the system to Tropical Cyclone 06B in post-season analysis, estimating winds of 100 km/h (60 mph). The convection organized around the center, and developed banding features, although Ogni weakened slightly to deep depression status on October 30. Soon after, it moved ashore Andhra Pradesh between Bapatla and Ongole. Later that day, Ogni degenerated into a remnant low.

A small system only 100 km (60 mi) in diameter, Ogni was the smallest storm on record in the basin from 1891 to 2007. The storm dropped heavy rainfall in southeastern India, peaking at 770 mm (30 in) in Avanigadda, Andhra Pradesh. About 900 villages were flooded in the state, with around 100,000 houses damaged or destroyed. Thousands of residents rode out floods on the roofs of their houses and 95,928 people had to evacuate to hundreds of emergency camps. The storm also disrupted power supplies and cut off roads. Ogni's rainfall damaged 199,986 acres (80,931 ha) of crop fields and killed 361,553 farm animals. Throughout Andhra Pradesh, Ogni killed 24 people, mostly on rice or shrimp farms. Damage totaled ₹2.1 billion (INR, US$47 million).

=== Other systems ===
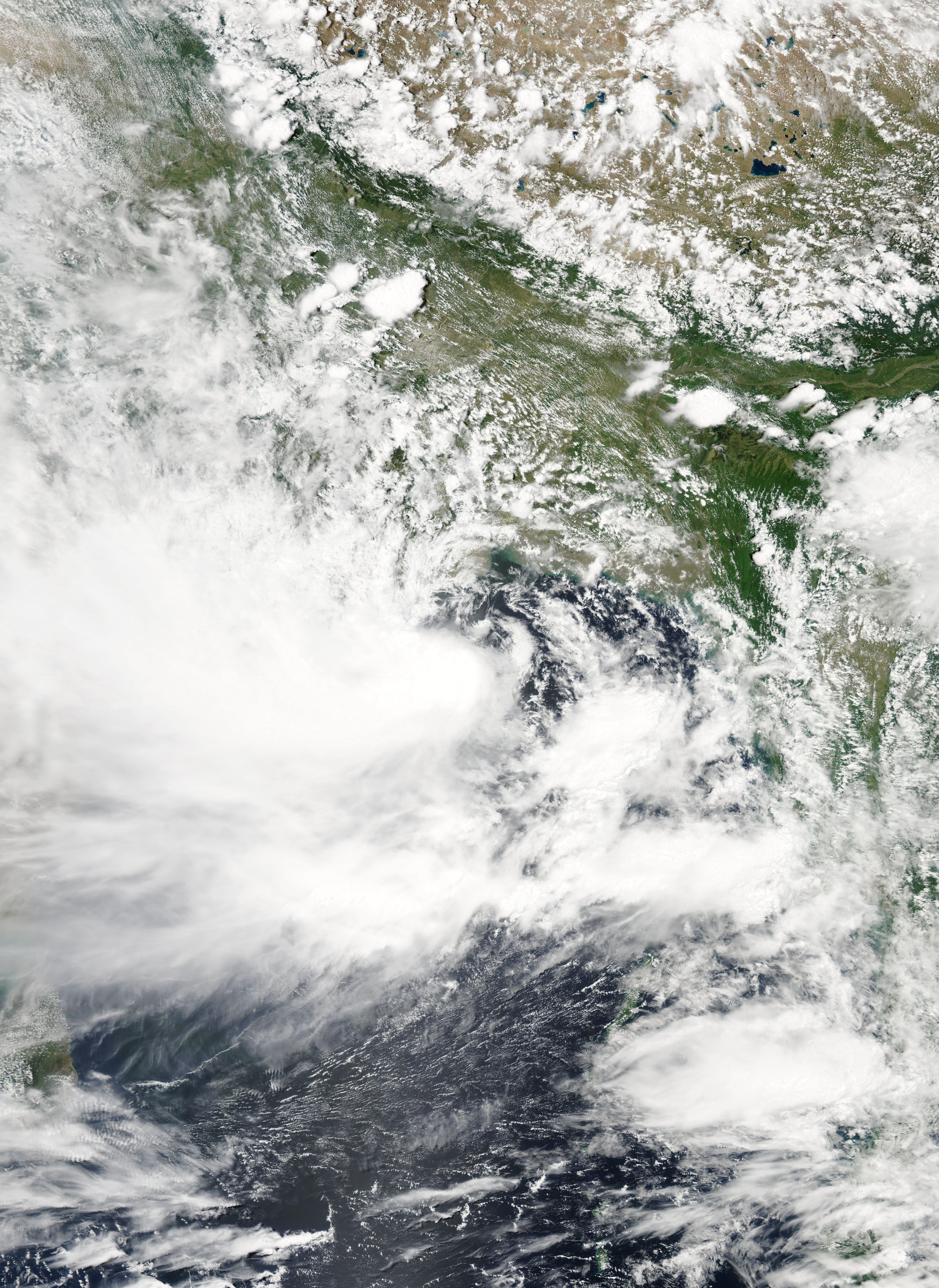
A deep depression off the coast of Odisha in August

During August 2006, a series of depressions formed in the Bay of Bengal, despite August typically being a climatologically quiet month.

The first originated out of an area of convection that persisted on August 1. A circulation exited from land into the northern portion of the bay, and despite high wind shear it developed into a depression on August 2 just 100 km (65 mi) offshore Chandabali. The system moved west-southwestward and quickly intensified into a deep depression, reaching winds of 55 km/h (35 mph) according to the IMD. Early on August 3, the system moved ashore Odisha between Puri and Gopalpur. It progressed inland and weakened, degenerating into a remnant low-pressure area on August 5.

About a week later, a low-pressure area formed on August 11 in the northern Bay of Bengal. By the next day, it organized into a depression, and quickly made landfall on Odisha near Balasore. The depression degenerated into a remnant low on August 13.

Another depression developed on August 16 in the same region, moving ashore later that day near Chandabali. It moved northwestward due to a ridge to the north, weakening into a remnant low on August 18 over Madhya Pradesh.

On August 29, the final of the four depressions formed near the Odisha coast, quickly moving ashore near Paradip. Like the preceding storm, it moved northwestward, dissipating on September 1 over Madhya Pradesh.

The series of depressions produced heavy rainfall in Odisha and Andhra Pradesh. Notably high daily rainfall totals included 320 mm (13 in) on August 4 in Pottangi, 380 mm (15 in) on August 14 at a station in Madhya Pradesh, 240 mm (9.4 in) on August 19 in Ratlam, and 320 mm (13 in) at two stations in Odisha on August 30. Collectively, the depressions killed 387 people, with the first deep depression alone responsible for 251 fatalities. The deaths occurred in Odisha, Andhra Pradesh, Madhya Pradesh, Chhattisgarh, Vidarbha, and Marathawada.

On December 6, the JTWC tracked the remnants of Typhoon Durian across Thailand into the Andaman Sea as a tropical depression. The system degenerated into a remnant low on the next day and continued across the Bay of Bengal, dissipating on December 9. The IMD did not track the system.

== Season effects ==
This is a table of all storms in the 2006 North Indian Ocean cyclone season. It mentions all of the season's storms and their names, durations, peak intensities (according to the IMD storm scale), landfall(s) – denoted by areas in parentheses – damages, and death totals. Damage and death totals include the damage and deaths caused when that storm was a precursor wave or extratropical low, and all of the damage figures are in 2006 USD.

Name	Dates	Peak intensity			Areas affected	Damage (USD)	Deaths	Ref(s).
Name	Dates	Category	Wind speed	Pressure	Areas affected	Damage (USD)	Deaths	Ref(s).
ARB 01	January 13–14	Deep Depression	55 km/h (35 mph)	1,004 hPa (29.65 inHg)	Kerala, Lakshadweep	None	0	
Mala	April 25–29	Extremely Severe Cyclonic Storm	185 km/h (115 mph)	954 hPa (28.17 inHg)	Andaman Islands, Myanmar (Rakhine State), Northern Thailand	$6.7 million	37	
BOB 02	July 2–5	Deep Depression	55 km/h (35 mph)	982 hPa (29.00 inHg)	East India (Odisha)	Unknown	133	
BOB 03	August 2–5	Deep Depression	55 km/h (35 mph)	986 hPa (29.12 inHg)	East India (Odisha)	Unknown	251	
BOB 04	August 12–13	Depression	45 km/h (30 mph)	992 hPa (29.29 inHg)	East India (Odisha)	Unknown	78	
BOB 05	August 16–18	Depression	45 km/h (30 mph)	988 hPa (29.18 inHg)	East India (Odisha)	Unknown	49	
BOB 06	August 29 – September 1	Depression	45 km/h (30 mph)	990 hPa (29.23 inHg)	East India (Odisha)	Unknown	9	
BOB 07	September 3–4	Depression	45 km/h (30 mph)	992 hPa (29.29 inHg)	East India (Odisha)	Unknown	0	
Land 01	September 21–24	Depression	45 km/h (30 mph)	996 hPa (29.41 inHg)	East India, Bangladesh	Unknown	98	
Mukda	September 21–24	Severe Cyclonic Storm	100 km/h (60 mph)	988 hPa (29.18 inHg)	Gujarat	Unknown	0	
BOB 08	September 28–30	Depression	45 km/h (30 mph)	1,002 hPa (29.59 inHg)	East India (Odisha)	Unknown	0	
Ogni	October 29–30	Cyclonic Storm	65 km/h (40 mph)	998 hPa (29.47 inHg)	South India (Andhra Pradesh), Sri Lanka	$353 million	35	
Season aggregates
13 systems	January 13 – December 7		185 km/h (115 mph)	954 hPa (28.17 inHg)		>$360 million	690	

== See also ==
- North Indian Ocean tropical cyclone
- Tropical cyclones in 2006
- 2006 Atlantic hurricane season
- 2006 Pacific hurricane season
- 2006 Pacific typhoon season
- South-West Indian Ocean cyclone seasons: 2005–06, 2006–07
- Australian region cyclone seasons: 2005–06, 2006–07
- South Pacific cyclone seasons: 2005–06, 2006–07
