= Cyclone Mala =

North Indian Ocean cyclone in 2006

Extremely Severe Cyclonic Storm Mala
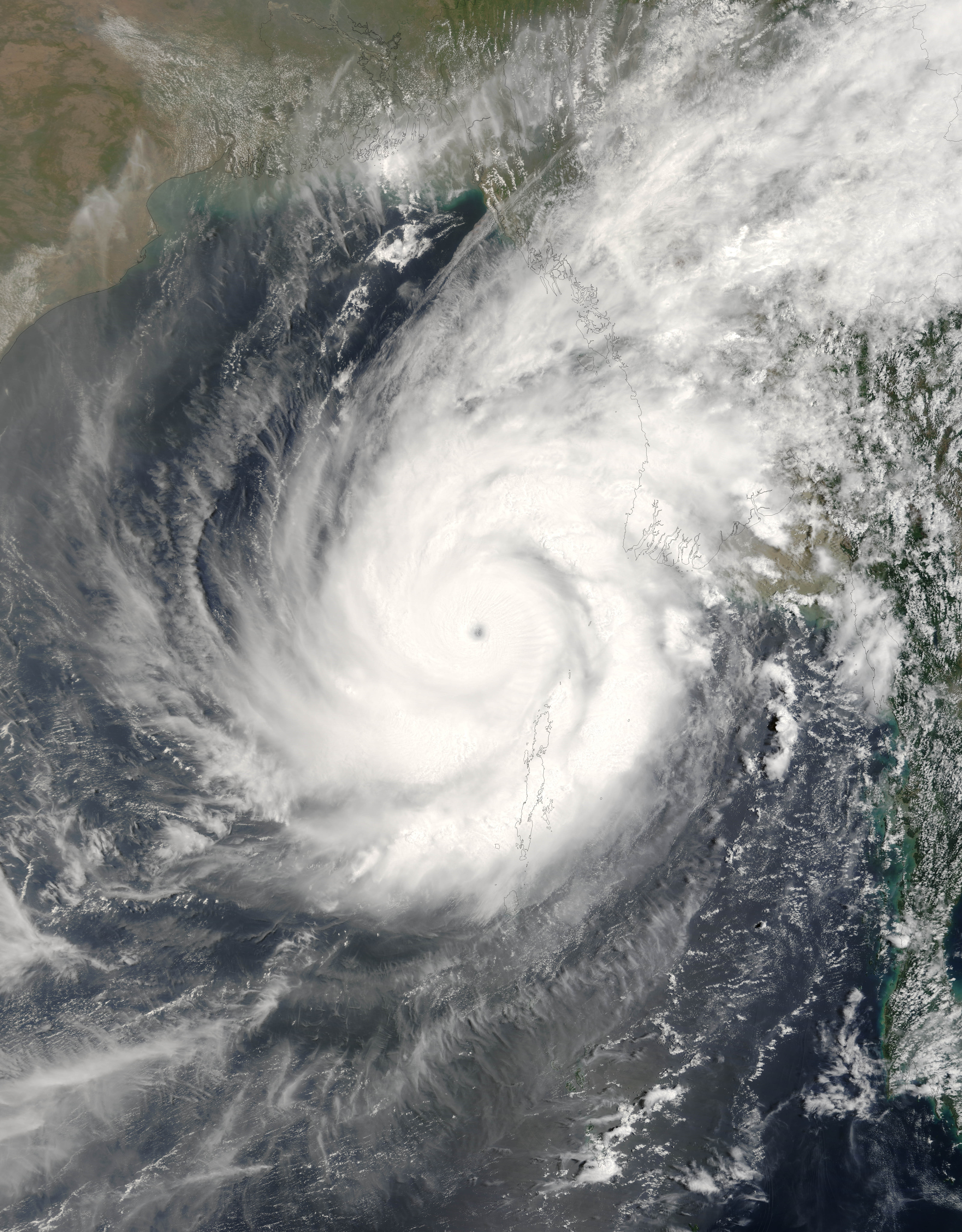
- Cyclone Mala on April 28, near peak intensity

Meteorological history
- Formed: April 25, 2006
- Dissipated: April 29, 2006

Extremely severe cyclonic storm
- 3-minute sustained (IMD)
- Highest winds: 185 km/h (115 mph)
- Lowest pressure: 954 hPa (mbar); 28.17 inHg

Category 4-equivalent tropical cyclone
- 1-minute sustained (SSHWS/JTWC)
- Highest winds: 220 km/h (140 mph)
- Lowest pressure: 922 hPa (mbar); 27.23 inHg

Overall effects
- Fatalities: 37
- Damage: $6.7 million (2006 USD)
- Areas affected: Andaman Islands, Myanmar, Northern Thailand
- IBTrACS
- Part of the 2006 North Indian Ocean cyclone season

Extremely Severe Cyclonic Storm Mala (Note: The name Mala (Sinhala: මාලා, [maːlaː]) was contributed by Sri Lanka and means "garland, wreath of flowers" in Sinhala.) was the strongest tropical cyclone of the 2006 North Indian Ocean cyclone season. In mid-April 2006, an area of disturbed weather formed over the southern Bay of Bengal and nearby Andaman Sea. Over a period of several days, the system became increasingly organized and was classified as a depression on April 24. Situated within a region of weak steering currents, the storm slowly intensified as it drifted in a general northward direction. It attained gale-force winds and was named Mala the next day. Conditions for strengthening improved markedly on April 27 and Mala subsequently underwent rapid intensification which culminated in the cyclone attaining its peak. Early on April 28, the cyclone had estimated winds of 185 km/h (115 mph). The Joint Typhoon Warning Center considered Mala to have been slightly stronger, classifying it as a Category 4-equivalent cyclone. Steady weakening ensued thereafter and the storm made landfall in Myanmar's Rakhine State on April 29. Rapid dissipation took place once onshore and Mala was last noted early the next morning.

In contrast to Mala's intensity, damage was relatively minimal across Myanmar due to adequate early warnings, while timely and effective evacuations minimized loss of life along the coast. The greatest damage resulted from a thunderstorm near Yangon on April 28 that spawned a possible tornado in an industrial zone. A total of 586 homes were damaged there. Just outside the city in the Hinthada District, a flash flood killed at least 18 people. Overall, the storm claimed 37 lives in the country and left US$6.7 million in damage. In the wake of Mala, the Red Cross distributed relief aid to affected residents while local officials set up shelters to house those left homeless. Government and social organizations donated 5.4 million kyat (US$4,320) in cash to survivors in the Ayeyarwady Region.

== Meteorological history ==
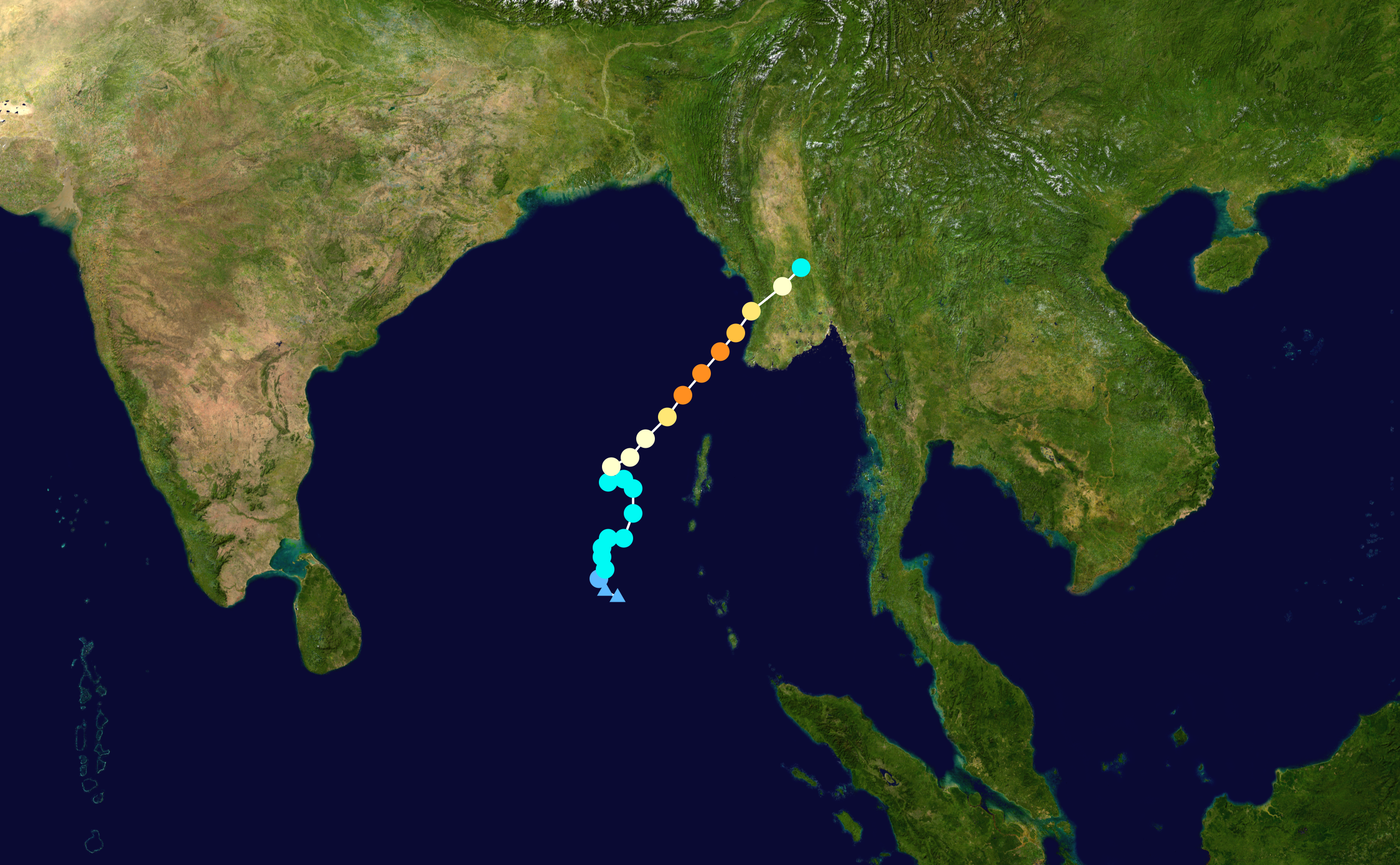
Map plotting the storm's track and intensity, according to the Saffir–Simpson scale Map key Saffir–Simpson scale Tropical depression (≤38 mph, ≤62 km/h) Tropical storm (39–73 mph, 63–118 km/h) Category 1 (74–95 mph, 119–153 km/h) Category 2 (96–110 mph, 154–177 km/h) Category 3 (111–129 mph, 178–208 km/h) Category 4 (130–156 mph, 209–251 km/h) Category 5 (≥157 mph, ≥252 km/h) Unknown Storm type Tropical cyclone Subtropical cyclone Extratropical cyclone, remnant low, tropical disturbance, or monsoon depression

In mid to late April 2006, a pulse in the Madden–Julian oscillation, coupled with a Kelvin wave (which later contributed to the formation of Typhoon Chanchu in the western Pacific), enhanced convective activity over the Bay of Bengal. By April 22, a trough developed along an axis from the southern Bay of Bengal eastward to the Andaman Sea. The Joint Typhoon Warning Center (JTWC) began monitoring the system for potential tropical cyclogenesis the following day. By 0600 UTC on April 24, an area of low pressure formed southeast of the Andaman Islands and the India Meteorological Department (IMD) began monitoring the disturbance. Quickly organizing, the low developed into a tropical depression later on April 24 and the JTWC began writing full advisories on the cyclone without issuing a Tropical Cyclone Formation Alert. Organization slowed thereafter due to moderate wind shear, but continued at a near-climatological rate as upper-level outflow allowed for continued convective development. Early on April 25, the JTWC estimated the system to have attained gale-force winds. The IMD followed suit later that day and subsequently assigned it the name Mala. Weak steering currents prompted slow and erratic movement with an overall northward trajectory.

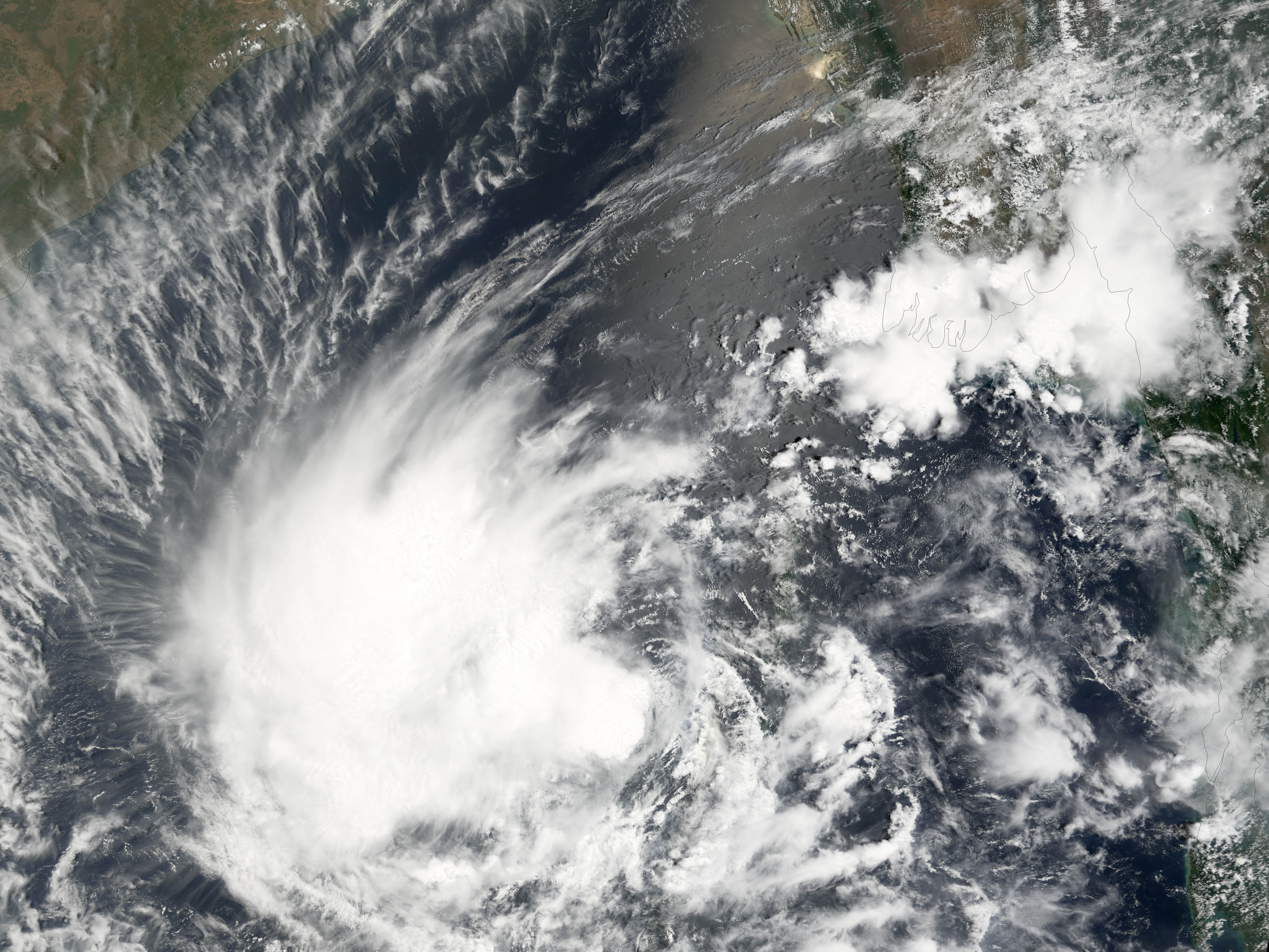
Cyclone Mala on April 26 struggling to develop under strong wind shear

Forecasters at this time anticipated little intensification as the system was expected to move into a region of higher shear. However, on April 27, the system moved under a subtropical ridge and conditions quickly became favorable for intensification. The presence of the ridge greatly enhanced the outflow over the cyclone and an eye developed by 1200 UTC. By this time, both the JTWC and IMD estimated Mala to have attained hurricane-force winds with the latter classifying it as a very severe cyclonic storm. The previously weak steering currents became more established as well, with the storm now tracking northeast toward Myanmar through a weakness in a ridge over Southeast Asia. Situated in an area with sea surface temperatures of 28 to 29 °C (82 to 84 °F), the cyclone was able to undergo rapid intensification as wind shear abruptly diminished. The IMD estimated Mala to have reached its peak intensity at 0900 UTC on April 28 with winds of 185 km/h (115 mph) and a barometric pressure of 954 mbar (hPa; 28.17 inHg). Using the Dvorak technique, a method of determining a tropical cyclone's strength via satellite imagery, the agency gave Mala a rating of T#5.5 which yields an intensity of 189 km/h (117 mph).

The JTWC estimated Mala to have been a stronger system, with peak winds of 220 km/h (135 mph) and a pressure of 922 mbar (922 hPa; 27.2 inHg) — equivalent to a Category 4 hurricane on the Saffir–Simpson hurricane wind scale. Their Dvorak values peaked at T#6.5 or 235 km/h (145 mph). As the powerful storm approached Myanmar, the combined effects of increasing wind shear and land interaction soon took their toll on Mala. At 0700 UTC on April 29, Mala made landfall just south of Thandwe in Myanmar's Rakhine State as a very severe cyclonic storm. The JTWC estimated winds at this time to have been 165 km/h (105 mph). Rapid weakening ensued once the cyclone moved onshore. Within 12 hours of landfall, Mala weakened to a deep depression and was last noted as a dissipating system early on April 30.

Sea surface temperatures in the wake of Cyclone Mala decreased up to 4–5 °C (39–41 °F) due to upwelling. From April 28–29, the low-level inflow associated affected much of the northern Bay of Bengal and resulted in northwesterly winds as far away as Hyderabad, India. These winds brought dry, dust filled air over the bay with mean particulate-matter doubling over the region.

== Preparations ==
On April 26, the local Department of Meteorology and Hydrology in Myanmar stated that the Ayeyarwady, Bago Region, and Yangon regions were likely to be affected within two days and Rakhine State within three days. Officials began broadcasting storm warning to the public over radio the following day. Evacuations of at-risk coastal areas were conducted, though specifics are unknown. Once the storm moved inland, residents across the country were advised of the likelihood of widespread heavy rain from the remnant system.

Despite never being forecast to strike Bangladesh, officials there warned residents that the storm could strike the nation and cause loss of life. Cautionary signals were raised at ports in Chittagong, Cox's Bazar, and Mongla, advising seafaring vessels to remain docked until the storm's passage. Roughly 34,000 members of the Bangladesh Red Crescent Society were placed on standby for possible relief efforts.

Flash flood warnings were issued across northern Thailand on April 29 under the threat of heavy rains from Mala's remnants.

== Impact ==
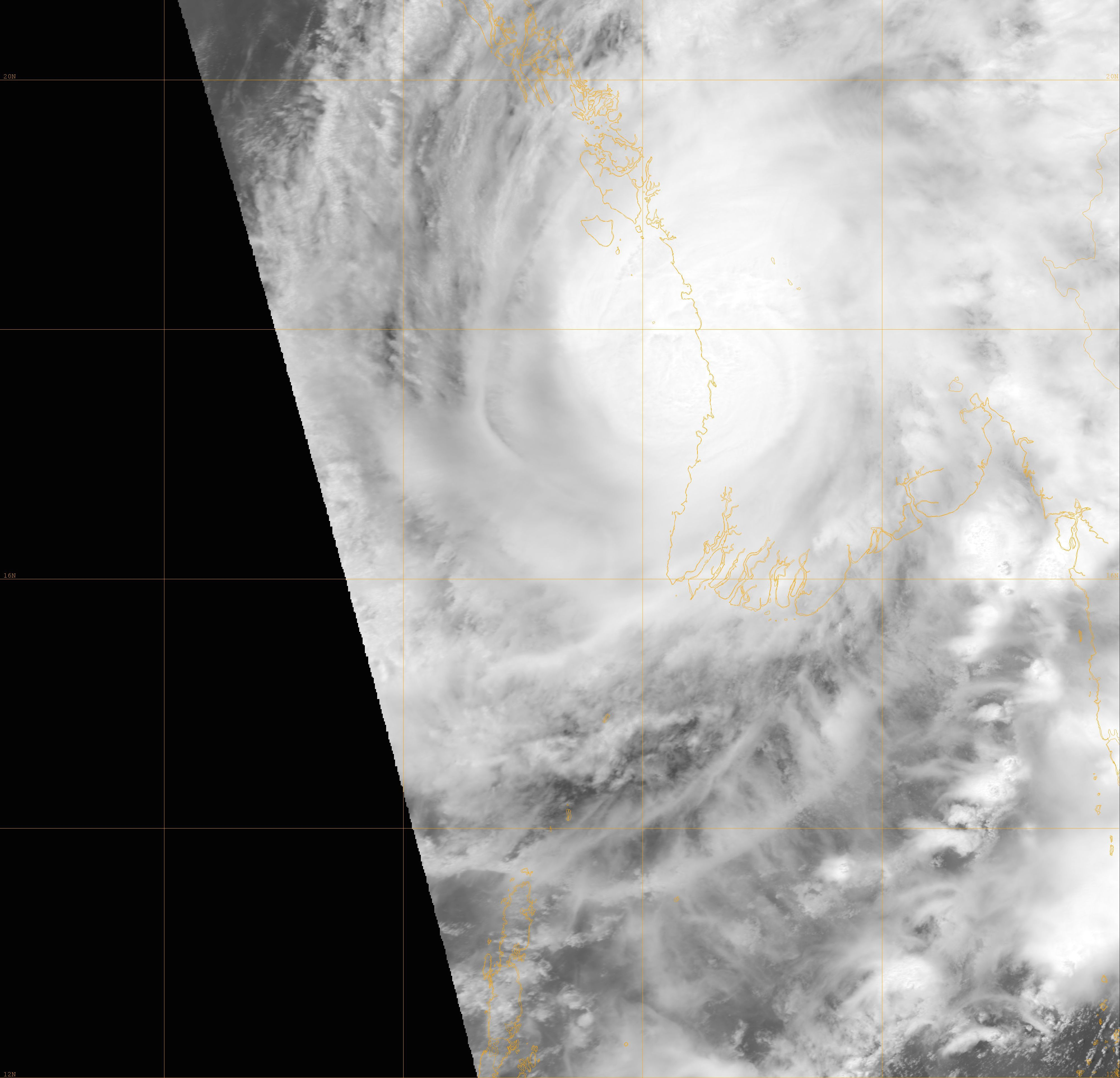
Cyclone Mala making landfall in Rakhine State on April 29

Throughout almost the entire existence of Mala, it produced rainfall in the Andaman and Nicobar islands. Daily totals peaked on April 27 at 100 mm (3.9 in) in Car Nicobar.

After moving through Myanmar, Mala brought heavy rains to northern Thailand. According to local meteorologists the storm also accelerated the onset of the seasonal monsoon which would contribute to a wetter-than-average year for the region.

=== Myanmar ===
Though Mala struck Myanmar as a powerful cyclone, early warnings and proper evacuations minimized loss of life along coastal areas. Additionally, no major storm surge was reported, limiting the potential for major damage. The most significant effects were caused inland from torrential rains rather than at the coast. Overall, the storm claimed 37 lives and left 1.24 billion kyat (US$6.7 million) in damage. Approximately 12,000 families were significantly affected by the cyclone.

Rakhine State suffered a direct hit from the cyclone, with Gwa Township reporting the worst damage. There, 88 homes were destroyed and 1,246 more were damaged. One person was killed and at least four others were injured in the township. Ra Haing Ku Toe village suffered significant losses as well, with 132 homes destroyed and 531 more damaged. A storm surge of 4.57 m (15.0 ft) struck the region, but did not impact populated areas.

Across the Irrawaddy Delta, hurricane-force winds caused extensive damage to housing and infrastructure. Haigyi Island was the first area struck by the storm. Several homes were destroyed and many more lost their roof there. Thunderstorms from the storm's outer bands on April 28 damaged 586 homes in Hlaingthaya Township. Residents described what appeared to be a tornado as the cause of the damage. The Hlaingthaya industrial zone was hardest hit, with five factories destroyed and dozens of homes having their roof torn off. Locals, however, claimed that the damage was more severe than reported by the government. Cars were reportedly tossed into the air during the storm. Two people were killed and fourteen others were injured in Hlaingthaya. The winds also downed numerous power lines, leaving many without electricity. In Labutta Township, near the southern tip of the Delta, 88 homes were destroyed. In the Hinthada District, torrential rains caused flash flooding that killed 18 people and left 14 others missing.

== Aftermath ==
By May 1, the local branch of the Red Cross distributed essential supplies to residents in Labutta Township. In coordination with the Disaster Assistance Response Team, the areas in greatest need for aid were identified and requests for tarpaulin were made. Members of the Cabinet of Burma donated 3.7 million kyat (US$2,960) in cash and 140 bags of rice to victims in the Ayeyarwady Region. On May 3, another 1.7 million kyat (US$1,360) was donated by social organizations to residents in rural areas outside Yangon. Temporary shelters were set up across Gwa Township. Local donations provided residents in the town with 200,000 kyat (US$160) worth of blankets, clothes, and cash. A local newspaper, The New Light of Myanmar, claimed that government officials immediately provided assistance to affected residents across the country. Red Cross operations continued through November 30, by which time 3,485 families were provided with aid. Additionally, though the agency planned to assist 4,000 families with rebuilding their homes, a lack of necessary funds prevented the operation. Instead, a cash donation was provided to the 1,000 most affected families.

== See also ==
- 2006 North Indian Ocean cyclone season
- Cyclone Nargis – A storm of similar intensity two years later that devastated the Irrawaddy Delta
- Cyclone Giri – A storm of similar intensity in 2010 that caused significant damage in areas just north of where Mala struck
- Cyclone Maarutha – A storm of weaker intensity in 2017 that caused some notable damage in northwestern areas of Myanmar in April
- Cyclone Mocha – A destructive storm of similar intensity and path in 2023 that caused widespread damages in Myanmar.
