= List of the wettest tropical cyclones by country =

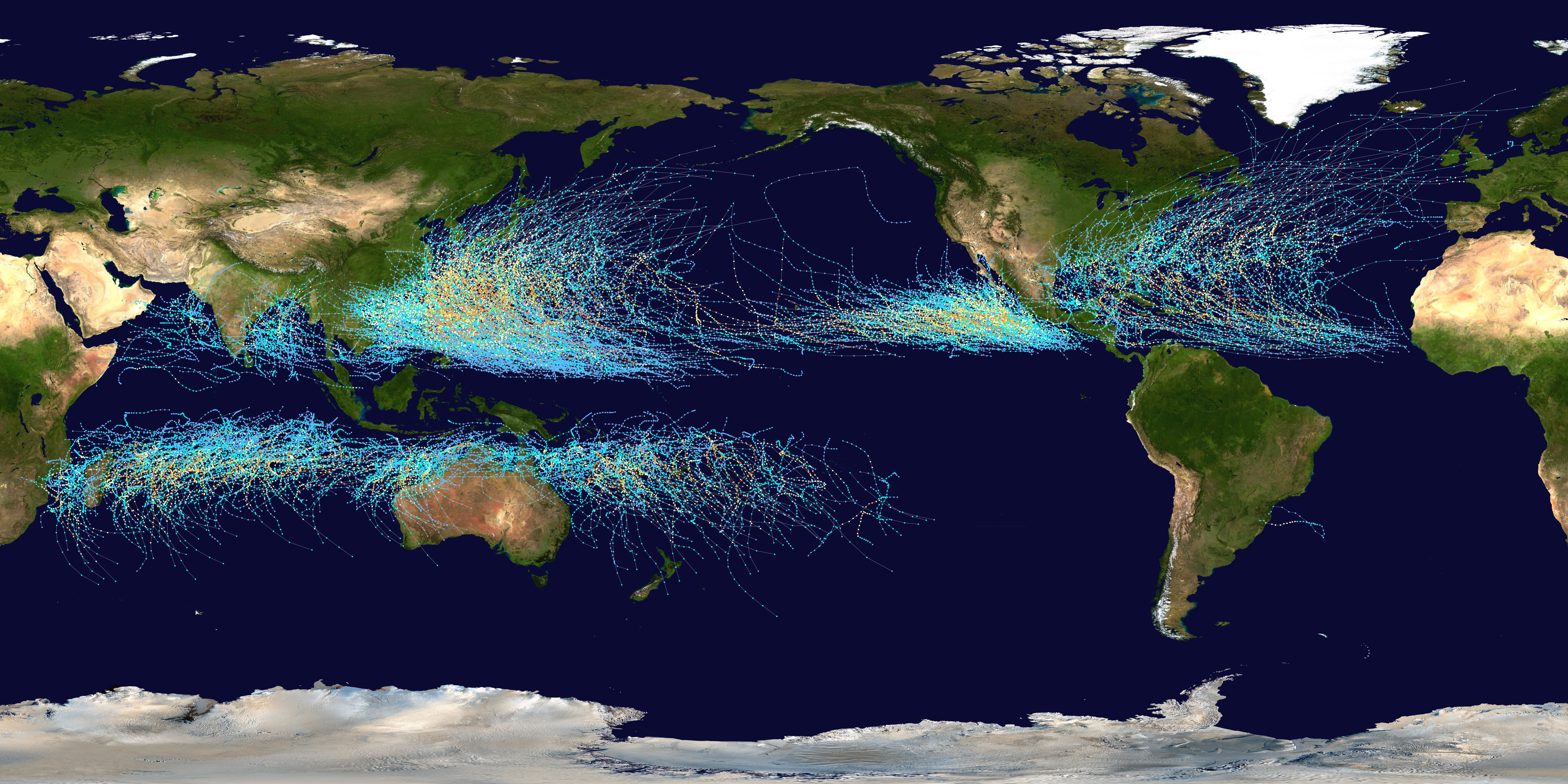
A map of all tropical cyclone tracks, encompassing the period between the years 1985 and 2005.

This is a list of wettest tropical cyclones by country, using all known available sources. Data is most complete for Australia, Cuba, Dominican Republic, Japan, Hong Kong, Mexico, Taiwan, Micronesia's Yap and Chuuk, and the United States, with fragmentary data available for other countries. The French region of Réunion holds several world records for tropical cyclone and worldwide rainfall, due to the rough topography and its location in the Indian Ocean.

== Antigua and Barbuda ==
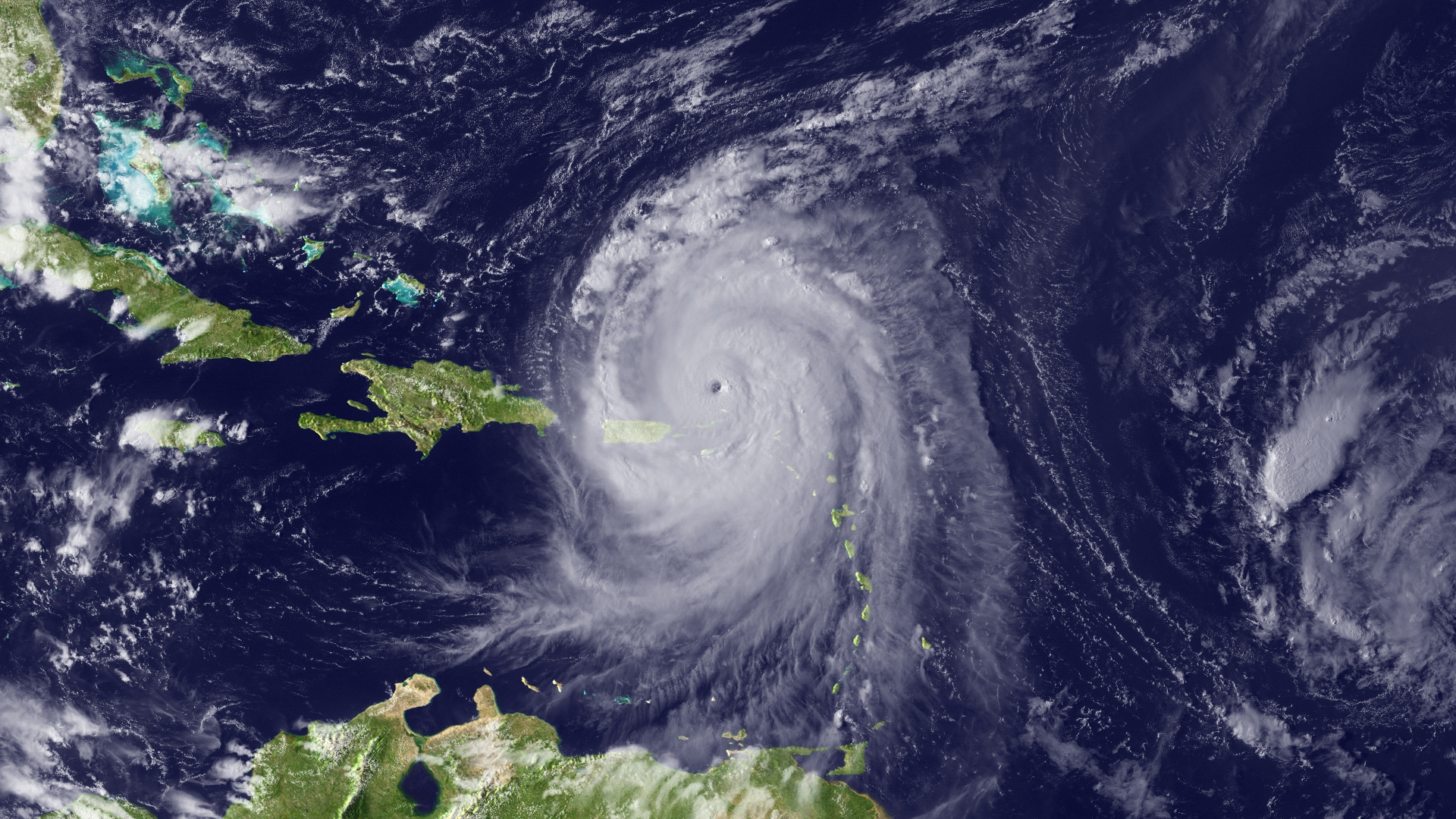
Hurricane Earl (2010)

Wettest tropical cyclones and their remnants in Antigua and Barbuda Highest-known totals
Precipitation			Storm	Location	Ref.
Rank	mm	in	Storm	Location	Ref.
1	463.6	18.25	Lenny 1999	V. C. Bird International Airport	
2	252.5	9.94	Luis 1995	V. C. Bird International Airport	
3	245.8	9.68	Frederic 1979	V. C. Bird International Airport	
4	232.6	9.16	Omar 2008	V. C. Bird International Airport	
5	198.3	7.81	Earl 2010	V. C. Bird International Airport	
6	194.1	7.64	Jose 1999	V. C. Bird International Airport	
7	188.9	7.44	Hugo 1989	V. C. Bird International Airport	
8	163.6	6.44	Daisy 1962	V. C. Bird International Airport	
9	159.2	6.27	Iris 1995	V. C. Bird International Airport	
10	146.9	5.78	Rafael 2012	V. C. Bird International Airport	

== Australia ==
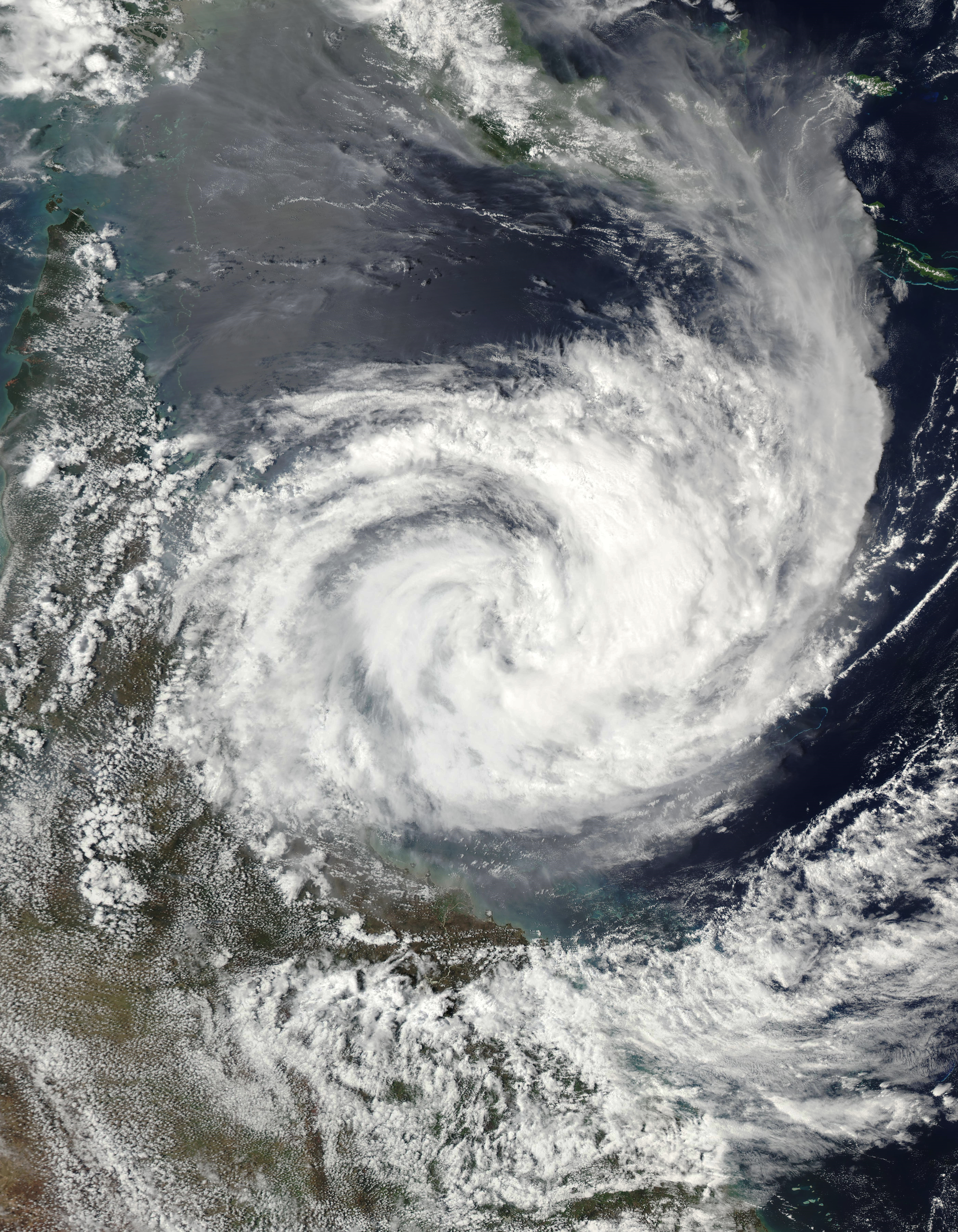
Cyclone Jasper

Wettest tropical cyclones and their remnants in Australia Highest-known totals
Precipitation			Storm	Location	Ref.
Rank	mm	in	Storm	Location	Ref.
1	2,252	88.66	Jasper 2023	Bairds	
2	1,947	76.65	Peter 1979	Mount Bellenden Ker	
3	1,870	73.62	Rona 1999	Mount Bellenden Ker	
4	1,318	51.89	Wanda 1974	Mount Glorious	
5	1,256.8	49.48	Fletcher 2014	Kowanyama	
6	1,111	43.74	Alfred 2025	Upper Springbrook	
7	1,082	42.60	Aivu 1989	Dalrymple Heights	
8	1,065	41.93	May 1998	Burketown	
9	1,000	39.37	Justin 1997	Willis Island	
10	1,000	39.37	Ellie 2009		

=== Christmas Island ===
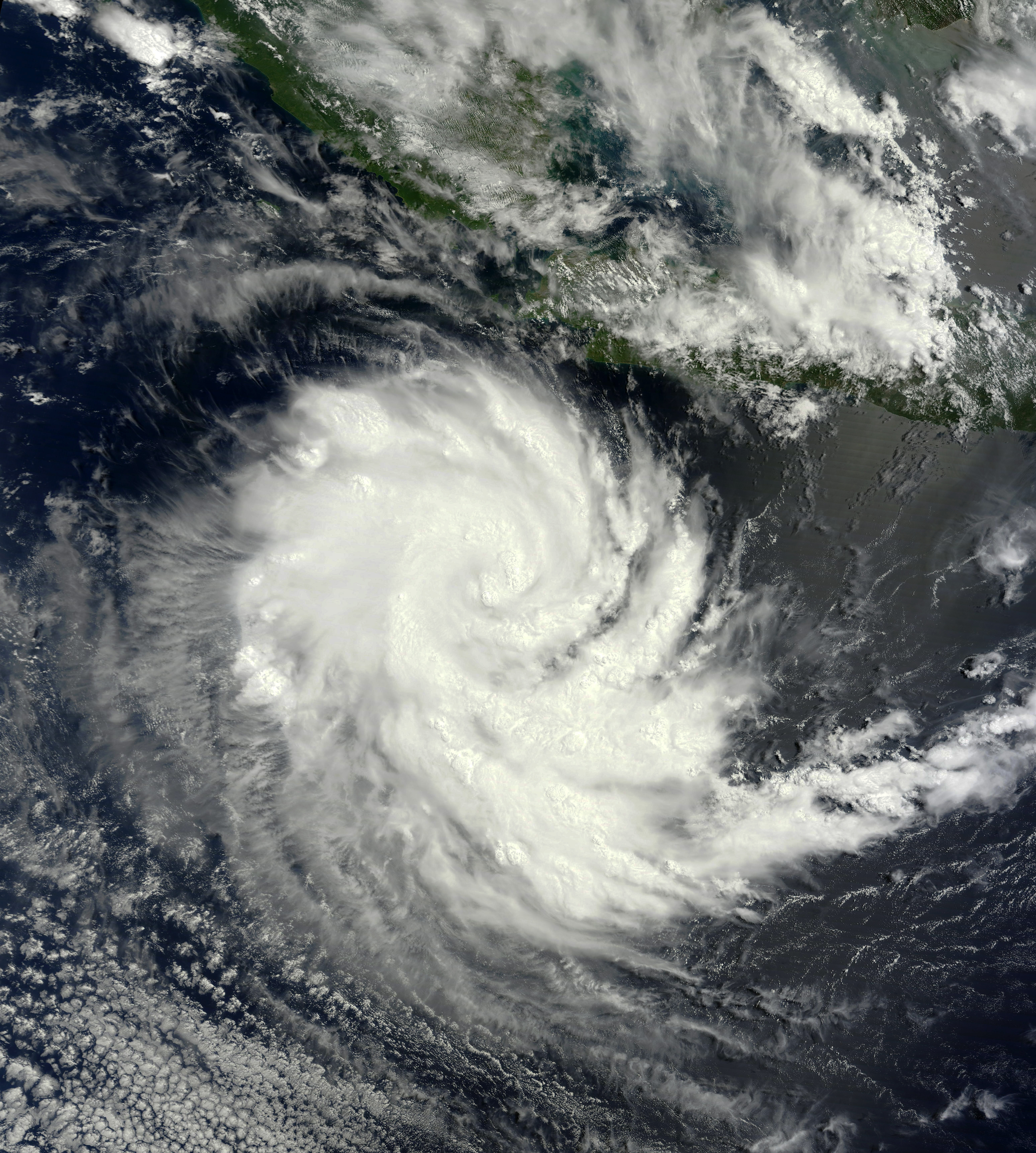
Cyclone Gillian

Christmas Island is an Australian territory located in the Indian Ocean located at the summit of a submarine mountain, which rises steeply to a central plateau that is dominated by stands of rainforest. After rainfall and wind observations started on the island during 1972, only 13 tropical cyclones passed within 220 km (135 mi) of the territory between 1972 and 2005.

Wettest tropical cyclones and their remnants on Christmas Island Highest-known totals
Precipitation			Storm	Location	Ref.
Rank	mm	in	Storm	Location	Ref.
1	368.2	14.5	Dahlia 2017	Christmas Island Airport	
2	220.2	8.67	Paddy 2021	Christmas Island Aero	
3	181.0	7.13	Gillian 2014	Christmas Island Airport	
4	115.6	4.55	Odette 2021	Christmas Island Airport	
5	102.4	4.03	Jacob 2007	Christmas Island Airport	
6	65.0	2.56	Cecily 1973		
7	52.8	2.08	Rosie 2008	Christmas Island Airport	
8	38	1.50	Norah 1974		
9	17	0.67	Denise 1975		

=== Cocos Islands ===
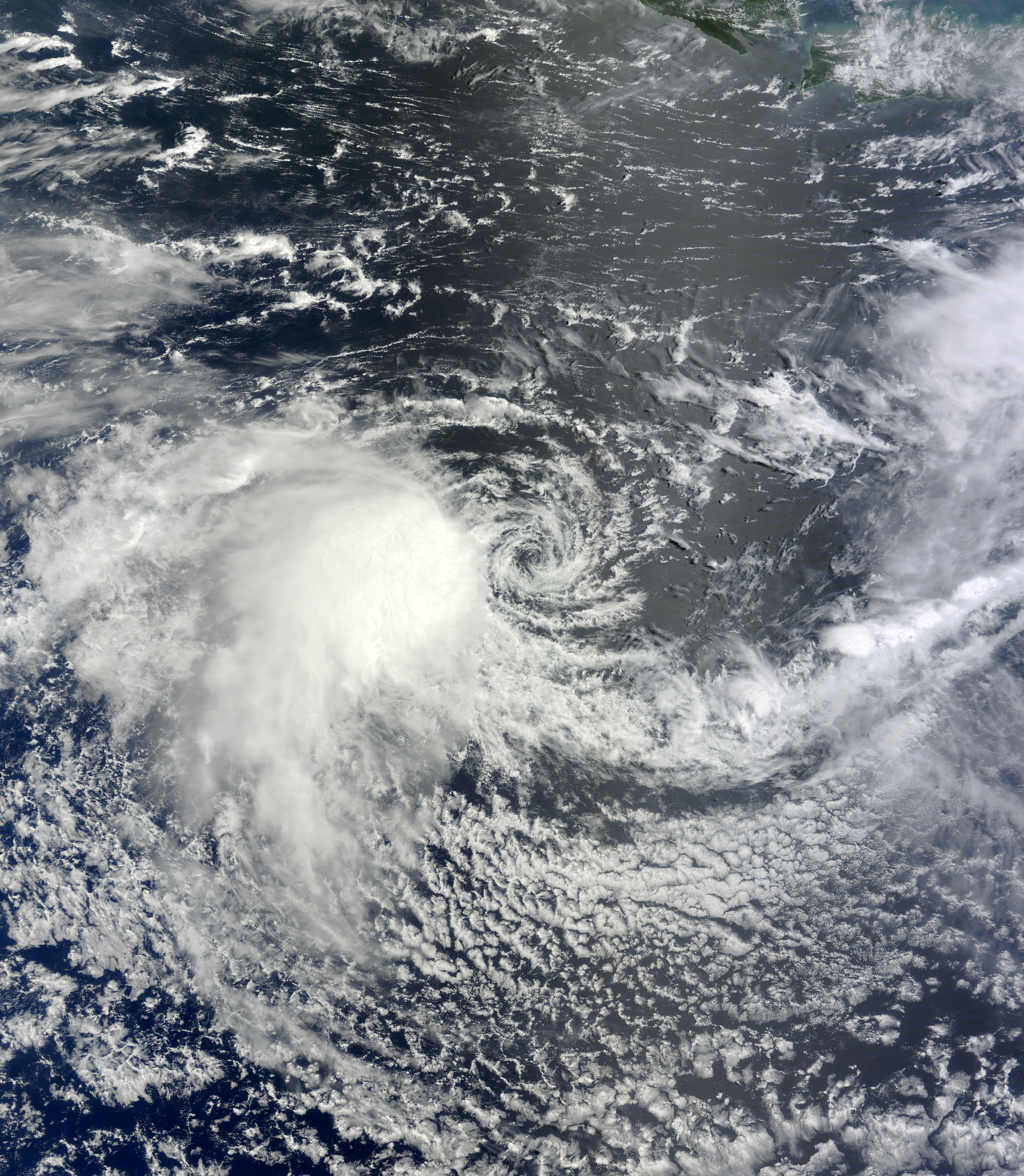
Although Tropical Low 11U in 2013 remained more than 120 km (75 mi) away from the Cocos Islands, wind shear displaced convection westward and over the islands for several days, resulting in record breaking rainfall.

The Cocos (Keeling) Islands are an Australian territory of 27 coral islands that are formed into two large coral atolls and cover an area of around 36 km^{2} (14 sq mi) of the Indian Ocean to the northwest of Perth, Australia. Rainfall observations started on the islands during 1907, while temperature, wind and other records started in 1952. Between 1952 and 2005 27 tropical cyclones caused storm force wind gusts of over 90 km/h (55 mph) on the islands, while only four caused hurricane-force gusts of over 125 km/h (80 mph).

Wettest tropical cyclones and their remnants in the Cocos Islands Highest-known totals
Precipitation			Storm	Location	Ref.
Rank	mm	in	Storm	Location	Ref.
1	844.6	33.25	11U 2013	Cocos Island Airport	
2	298.0	11.73	Pedro 1989		
3	170.0	6.69	Walter 2001		
4	160.0	6.30	Adeline-Juliet 2005		
5	127.0	5.00	Deidre-Dalida 1973		
6	115.0	4.53	Bruce 2013	Cocos Island Airport	
7	107.6	4.24	Kate 2014	Cocos Island Airport	
8	89.4	3.52	Norah 1974		
9	66.9	2.63	Annie 1973		
10	56.0	2.20	Anggrek 2010	Cocos Island Airport	

== Bahamas ==
Tropical Storm Noel over the Bahamas

Wettest tropical cyclones and their remnants in the Bahamas Highest-known totals
Precipitation			Storm	Location	Ref.
Rank	mm	in	Storm	Location	Ref.
1	747.5	29.43	Noel 2007	Long Island	
2	580.1	22.84	Dorian 2019	Hope Town	
3	500.3	19.70	Matthew 2016	Matthew Town, Inagua	
4	436.6	17.19	Flora 1963	Duncan Town	
5	390.1	15.36	Inez 1966	Nassau Airport	
6	337.1	13.27	Fox 1952	New Providence	
7	321.1	12.64	Michelle 2001	Nassau	
8	309.4	12.18	Erin 1995	Church Grove	
9	260.0	9.88	Fay 2008	Freeport	
10	236.7	9.32	Floyd 1999	Little Harbor Abacos	

== Bangladesh ==
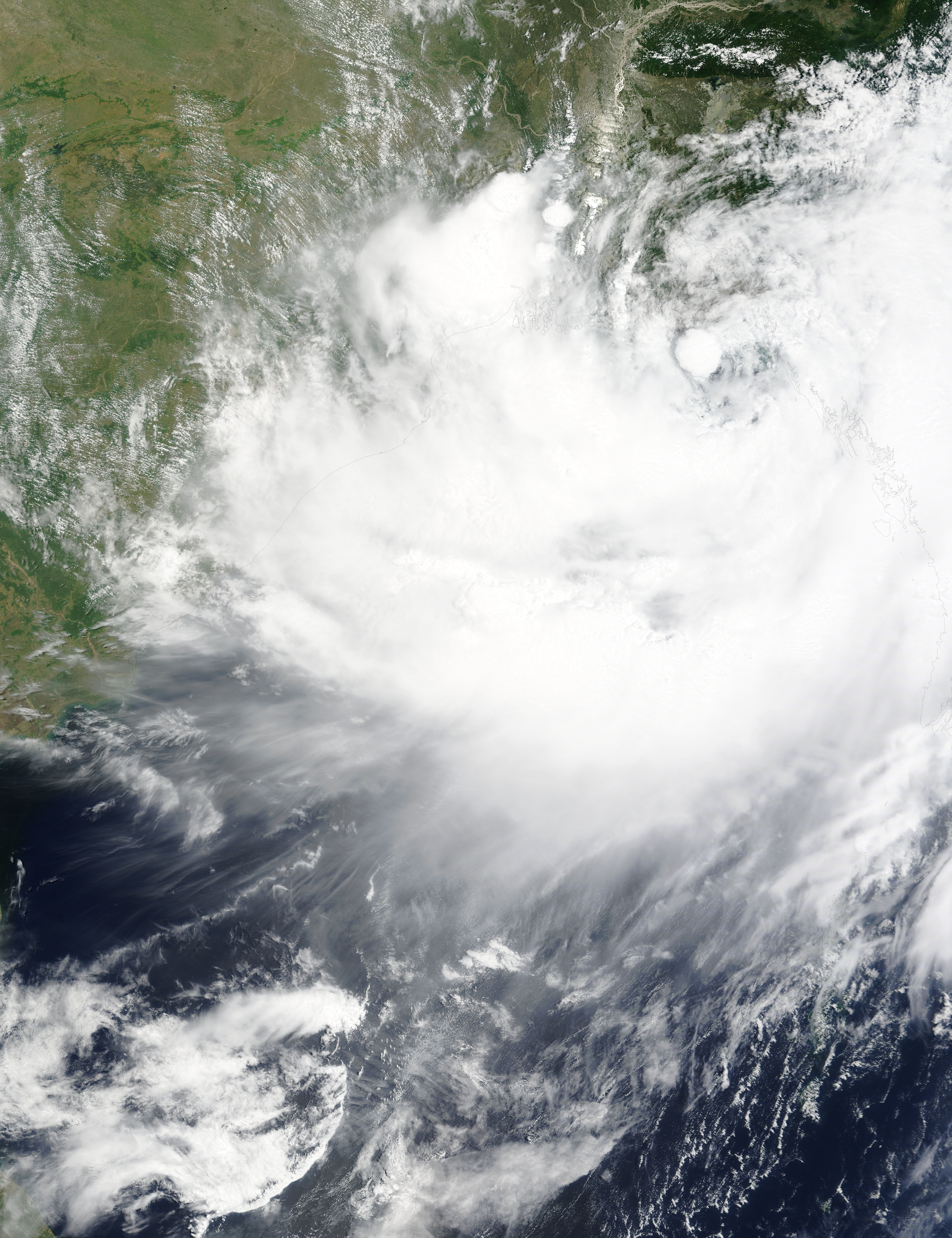
Cyclone Komen approaching Bangladesh on July 29, 2015

Bangladesh has been the scene of the greatest tropical cyclone casualties in recent times. The country is quite flat and generally lies near sea level.

Wettest tropical cyclones and their remnants in Bangladesh Highest-known totals
Precipitation			Storm	Location	Ref.
Rank	mm	in	Storm	Location	Ref.
1	1,051.2	41.39	Komen 2015	Chittagong	
2	~300	~12.00	Rashmi 2008		
3	280	11.02	Monsoon Depression — Sep. 2004	Barisal	
4	253	10.00	Viyaru 2013	Patuakhali	
5	227.2	8.94	Trop. Depression — Oct. 2004	Rangpur	
6	220.0	8.66	Bhola 1970	Maya Bandar	
7	200	7.87	Sidr 2007		
8	130	5.11	Aila 2009	Chittagong	
9	129	5.07	Bijli 2009		
10	53	2.13	Akash 2007		

== Belize ==
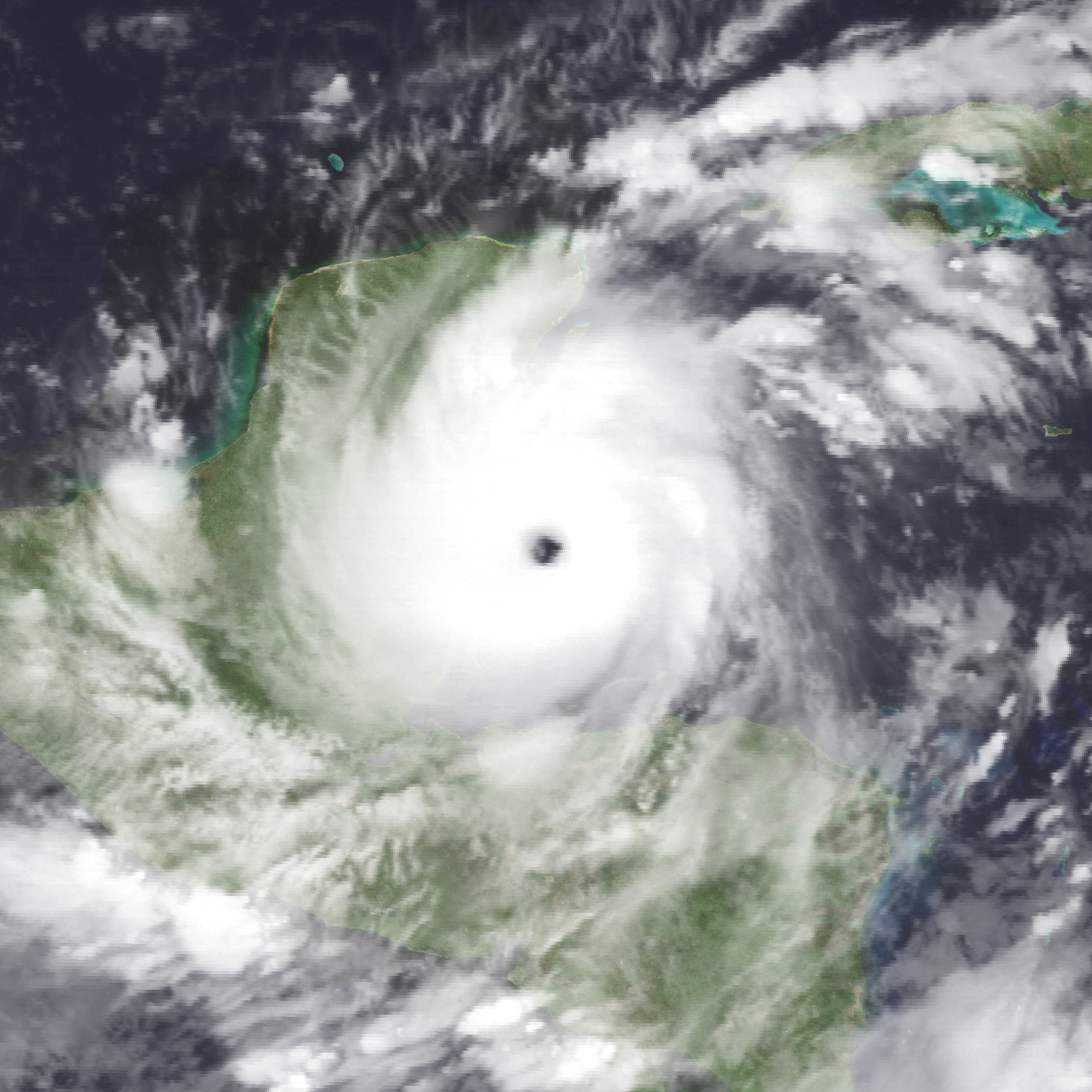
Hurricane Keith (2000)

This country has terrain mainly across its southern sections, with elevations up to about 3,700 feet (1,100 m). The highest reported rainfall in what was formerly British Honduras occurred during Hurricane Keith in 2000 when 32.67 inches (830 mm) of rain fell in a 24‑hour period at Phillip Goodson International Airport in Belize City. Equally heavy rains could have fallen during Hurricane Hattie of 1961 and Hurricane Fifi of 1974.

Wettest tropical cyclones and their remnants in Belize Highest-known totals
Precipitation			Storm	Location	Ref.
Rank	mm	in	Storm	Location	Ref.
1	829.8	32.67	Keith 2000	Philip Goldson Airport	
2	555.2	21.86	Eta 2020	Baldy Beacon	
3	546.6	21.52	Sixteen 2008	Baldy Beacon	
4	299.7	11.80	Amanda 2020	Belmopan	
5	249.2	9.81	Chantal 2001	Towerhill	
6	246.0	9.69	Mitch 1998	Central Farm Meteorological Station	
7	241.0	9.49	Gert 1993	Hunting Caye	
8	240.6	9.47	Nadine 2024	Ranchito	
9	179.0	7.05	Greta 1978	Central Farm Meteorological Station	
10	152.4	6.00	Fifi 1974	La Placencia	

== Cambodia ==
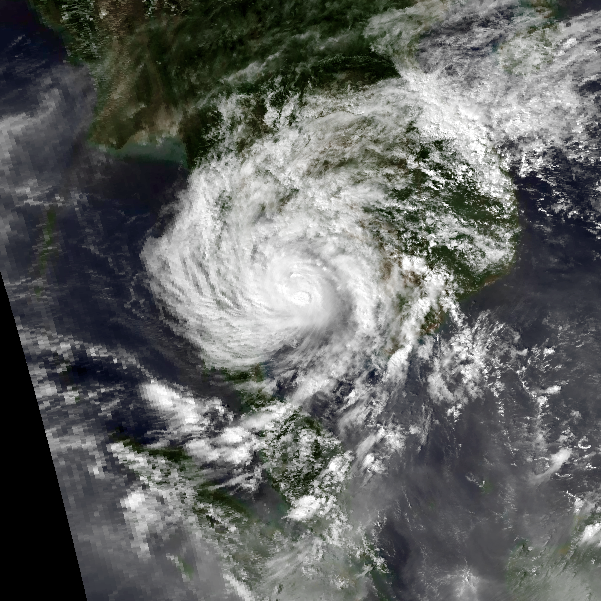
Typhoon Linda (1997)

Wettest tropical cyclones and their remnants in Cambodia Highest-known totals
Precipitation			Storm	Location	Ref.
Rank	mm	in	Storm	Location	Ref.
1	404.1	15.91	Linda 1997	Kompot	
2	240.0	9.45	Violet 1964	Paksa	
3	30.5	1.20	Faith 1998	Kompong Cham	

== Canada ==
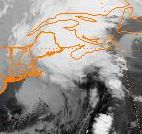
Extratropical cyclone Harvey near Nova Scotia

Tropical cyclones are usually in transition to extratropical cyclones by the time they reach Atlantic Canada, though occasionally they retain their tropical status. No tropical cyclone has ever hit Canada's Pacific coast.

Wettest tropical cyclones and their remnants in Canada Highest-known totals
Precipitation			Storm	Location	Ref.
Rank	mm	in	Storm	Location	Ref.
1	302.0	11.89	Harvey 1999	Oxford, NS	
2	249.9	9.84	Beth 1971	Halifax, NS	
3	238.0	9.37	Igor 2010	St. Lawrence, NL	
4	224.8	8.85	Matthew 2016	Sydney, NS	
5	221	8.70	Debby 2024	Lanoraie, QC	
6	213.6	8.41	Hazel 1954	Snelgrove, ON	
7	212.0	8.35	Fiona 2022	Cape North, NS	
8	210.0	8.26	Earl 2022	Paradise, NL	
9	191.0	7.52	Bertha 1990	Hunters Mountain, NS	
10	185.0	7.28	Sandy 2012	Charlevoix, QC	

== China ==
China is a mountainous country, which leads to rapid dissipation of cyclones that move inland as well as significant amounts of rain from those dissipating cyclones. Typhoon Nina (1975) caused the collapse of two huge reservoirs and ten smaller dams when 1,062 millimetres (41.8 in) fell in Henan during a 24‑hour period, which is the record for Mainland China. Typhoon Sam of the 1999 Pacific typhoon season became the wettest known tropical cyclone to impact Hong Kong since records began in 1884, breaking a 73‑year‑old record. Precipitation associated with tropical cyclones and their remains can bring snow to Tibet. An early October 2004 tropical depression brought daily precipitation of 6 centimetres (2.4 in) of liquid equivalent precipitation to Che-Ku county in the form of heavy snow, which was a new October daily precipitation record for both rain and snow. This led to a loss of 340,000 kg of food, 230,000 kg of forage grass, and 263 livestock in the snowstorm.

=== Mainland ===
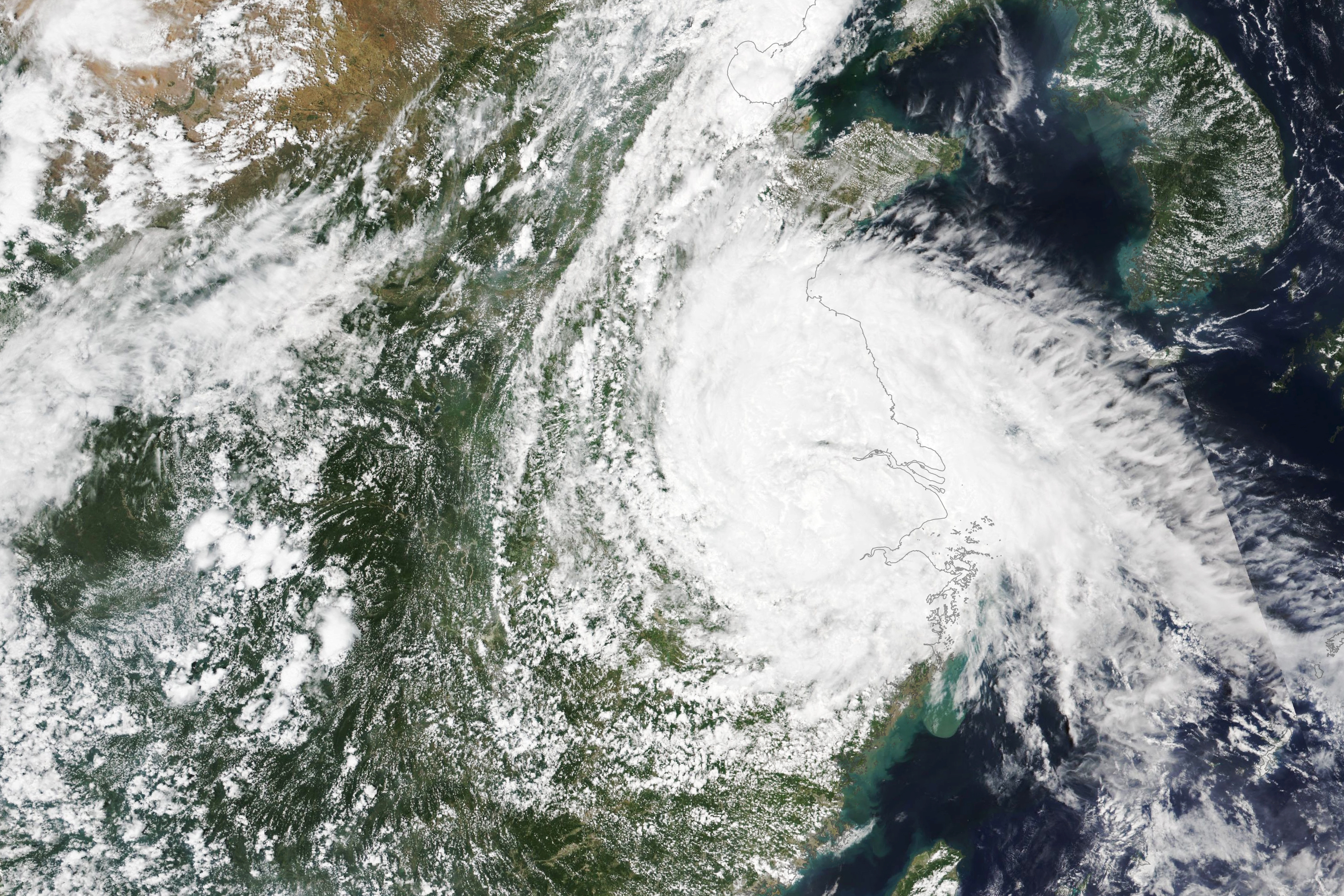
Typhoon In-fa

Wettest tropical cyclones and their remnants in Mainland China Highest-known totals
Precipitation			Storm	Location	Ref.
Rank	mm	in	Storm	Location	Ref.
1	1629.0	64.13	Nina 1975	Banqiao Dam	
2	951.0	37.4	In-fa 2021	Yuyao	
3	831.1	32.72	Fitow 2001	Changjiang County	
4	806.0	31.73	Soudelor 2015	Wenzhou	
5	744.8	29.32	Doksuri 2023	Wangjiayuan Reservoir	
6	662.0	26.01	Chanthu 2021	Dinghai District, Zhoushan	
7	600.0	24.00	Haikui 2012	Anhui Province	
8	555.0	21.85	Chanchu 2006	Zhangpu County	

=== Hong Kong ===
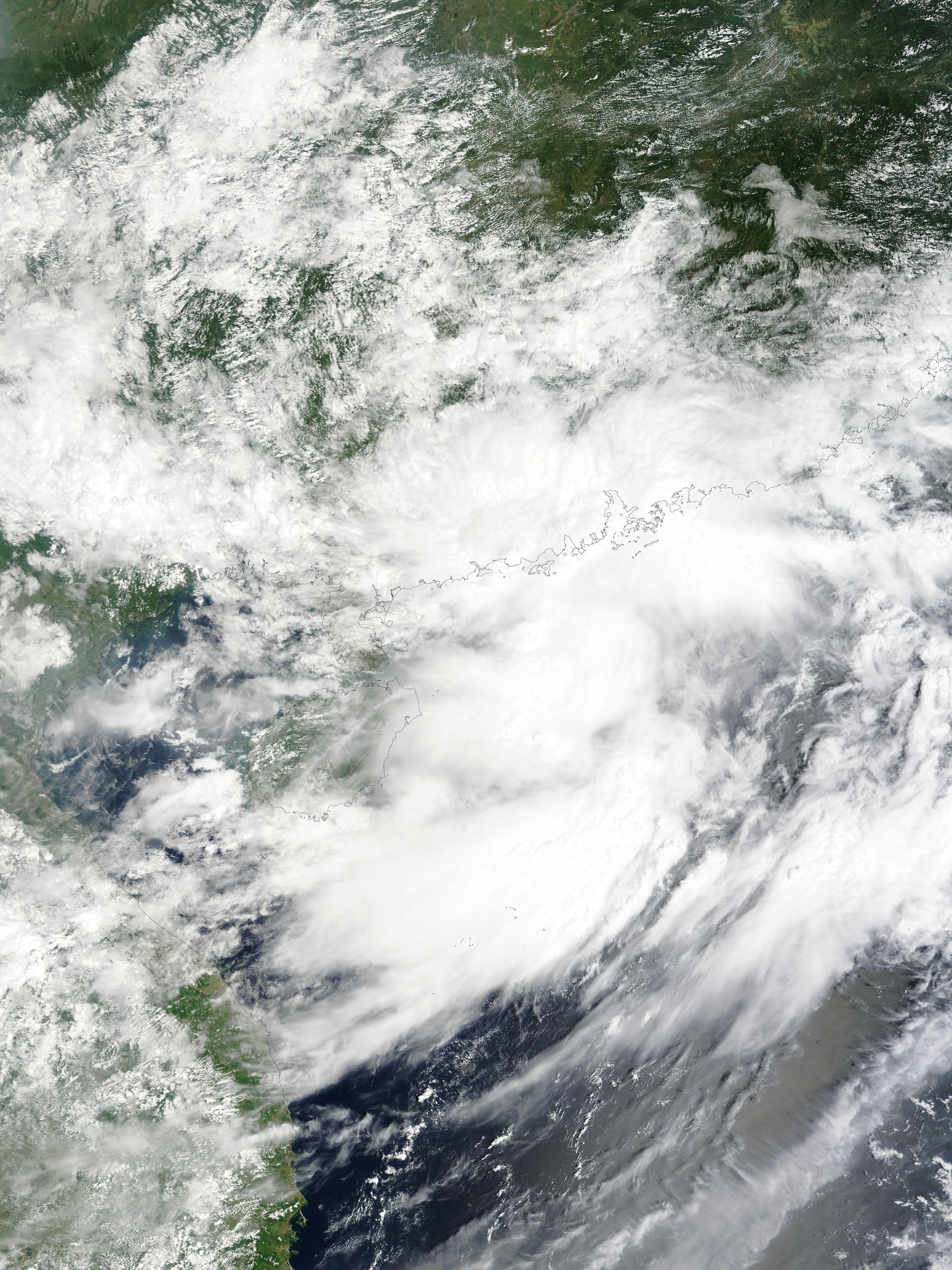
Typhoon Haikui

Wettest tropical cyclones and their remnants Hong Kong Highest-known totals
Precipitation			Storm	Location	Ref.
Rank	mm	in	Storm	Location	Ref.
1	632.0	24.90	Haikui 2023	Hong Kong Observatory	
2	616.5	24.27	Sam 1999	Hong Kong Observatory	
3	597.0	23.50	July 1926 Typhoon	Royal Observatory, Hong Kong	
4	562.0	22.13	June 1916 Typhoon	Royal Observatory, Hong Kong	
5	530.7	20.89	Agnes 1965	Royal Observatory, Hong Kong	
6	519.0	20.43	Agnes 1978	Royal Observatory, Hong Kong	
7	516.1	20.32	Ellen 1976	Royal Observatory, Hong Kong	
8	497.5	19.59	Dot 1993	Royal Observatory, Hong Kong	
9	491.7	19.36	Dot 1982	Royal Observatory, Hong Kong	
10	480.9	18.93	Helen 1995	Royal Observatory, Hong Kong	

== Costa Rica ==
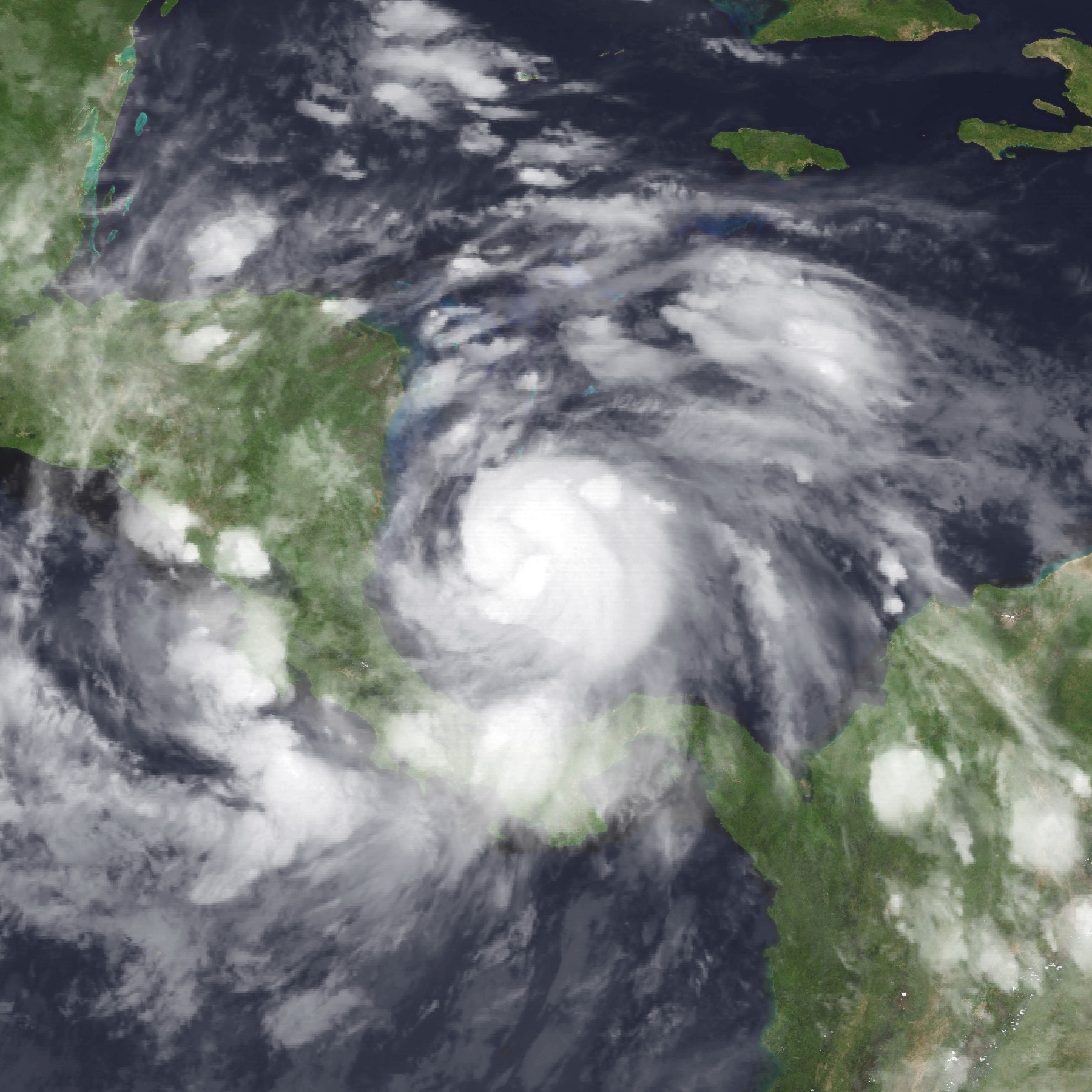
Hurricane Cesar

Wettest tropical cyclones and their remnants in Costa Rica Highest-known totals
Precipitation			Storm	Location	Ref.
Rank	mm	in	Storm	Location	Ref.
1	920.0	36.22	Cesar 1996	Alto de Tinamaste	
2	624.4	24.58	Eta 2020	Arunachala	
3	487.4	19.19	Nate 2017	Maritima	
4	466.6	18.37	Mitch 1998	Jaco	
5	376.4	14.82	Alma 2008	Quepos	
6	331.5	13.05	Gert 1993	Unknown	
7	308.0	12.11	Otto 2016	Miravalles Volcano	

== Cuba ==
Hurricane Flora of October 1963 drifted across Cuba for four days, leading to extreme rainfall across the mountainous island country. During the heaviest 24‑hour period of rainfall, 735 millimetres (28.9 in) of rain fell at Santiago de Cuba. Total amounts of 2,033 millimetres (80.0 in) over 4 days and 2,550 millimetres (100 in) over 5 days produced staggering loss of life in Cuba, where over 2000 perished.

Hurricane Dennis

Wettest tropical cyclones and their remnants in Cuba Highest-known totals
Precipitation			Storm	Location	Ref.
Rank	mm	in	Storm	Location	Ref.
1	2,550	100.39	Flora 1963		
2	1,092	42.99	Dennis 2005		
3	1,025	40.35	T.D. #1 1988		
4	1,012	39.84	Alberto 1982		
5	870	34.25	Frederic 1979		
6	849	33.43	T.D. #1 1992		
7	825	32.48	Laura 1971		
8	800	31.50	Irene 1999		
9	754	29.69	Michelle 2001		
10	747	29.41	Lili 1996		

== Dominica ==
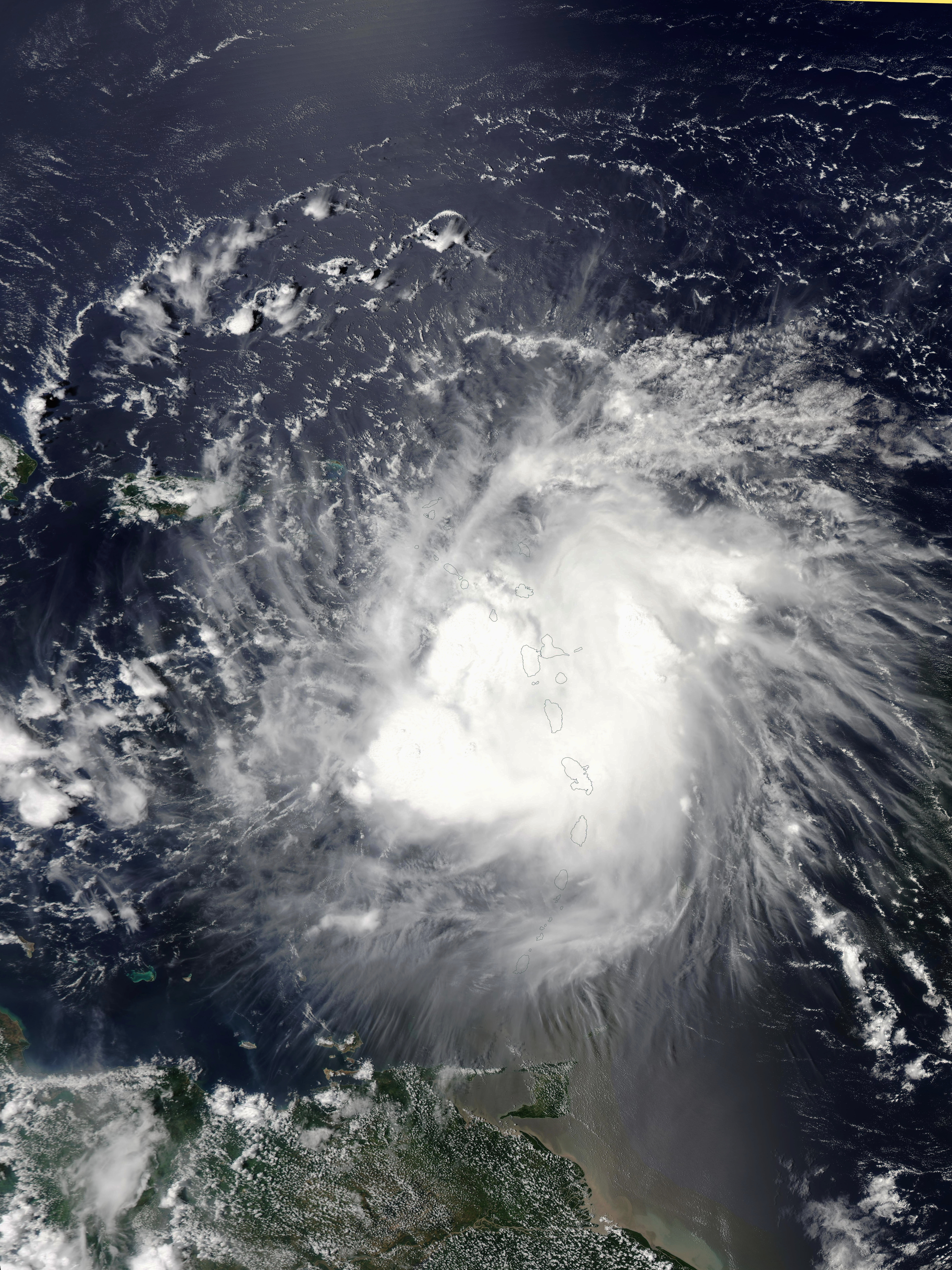
Erika near Dominica

The islands of the eastern Caribbean are constantly threatened by tropical storms and hurricanes, mainly between August and October. Dominica is a rugged island, with spots of elevation as high as nearly 4,750 feet (1,450 m). As Hurricane Jeanne moved through the region, 422.3 millimetres (16.63 in) of rain fell during the 24‑hour period ending on the morning of September 15, 2004.

Wettest tropical cyclones and their remnants in Dominica Highest-known totals
Precipitation			Storm	Location	Ref.
Rank	mm	in	Storm	Location	Ref.
1	800–850	31–33	Erika 2015	Morne Diablotins	
2	579.1	22.80	Maria 2017	Cophall	
3	422.3	16.63	Jeanne 2004		
4	246.4	9.70	Edith 1963		
5	215.9	8.50	David 1979	Roseau	
6	150.1	5.91	Abby 1960		
7	79.5	3.13	Isaias 2020	Salisbury	
8	20.6	0.81	Flora 1963		

== Dominican Republic ==
Noel near Dominican Republic

The Dominican Republic, has some of the highest terrain surrounding the Caribbean Sea, with Pico Duarte peaking at 10,700 feet (3,300 m) above sea level. Most of the tropical cyclone rainfall totals on the list below are 24‑hour maxima, which likely underrepresent the storm total.

Wettest tropical cyclones and their remnants the Dominican Republic Highest-known totals
Precipitation			Storm	Location	Ref.
Rank	mm	in	Storm	Location	Ref.
1	1001.5	39.43	Flora 1963	Polo Barahona	
2	905.0	35.63	Noel 2007	Angelina	
3	598.0	23.54	Cleo 1964	Polo	
4	528.0	20.79	Emily 2011	Neyba	
5	505.2	19.89	Jeanne 2004	Isla Saona	
6	479.8	18.89	Inez 1966	Polo	
7	445.5	17.54	Hurricane Four 1944	Hondo Valle	
8	391.4	15.41	Hurricane Five 1935	Barahona	
9	359.9	14.17	Hanna 2008	Oveido	
10	350.0	13.78	T.S. One 1948	Bayaguana	

== El Salvador ==
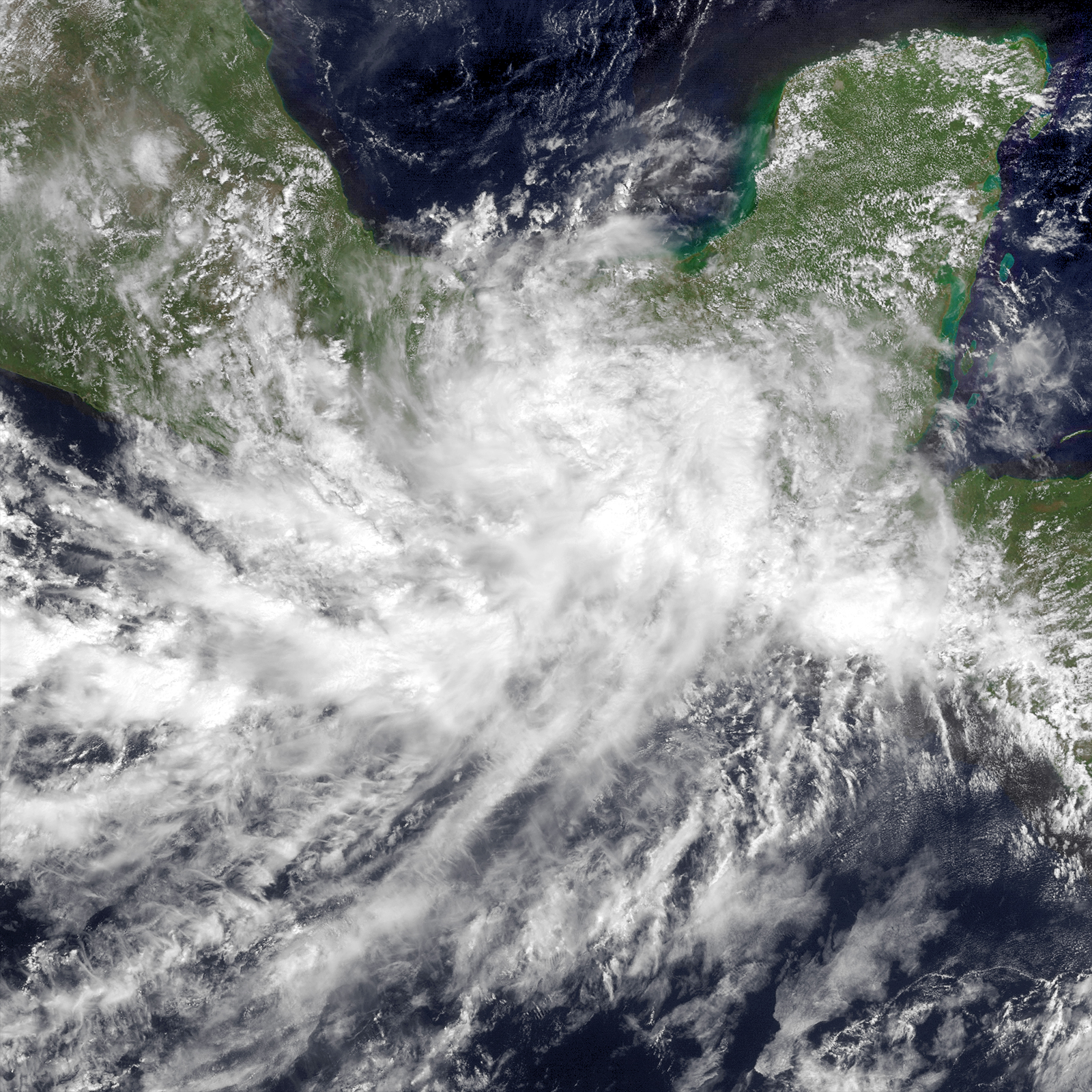
Tropical Depression Twelve-E (2011)

Wettest tropical cyclones and their remnants in El Salvador Highest-known totals
Precipitation			Storm	Location	Ref.
Rank	mm	in	Storm	Location	Ref.
1	1513	59.57	Twelve E (2011)	Huizucar, La Libertad	
2	1.017	40.03	Amanda 2020		
3	861	33.90	Mitch 1998		
4	766	30.16	Stan 2005		
5	676	26.61	Paul 1982		
6	672	26.46	Agatha 2010		
7	603	23.74	Matthew 2010		
8	275.4	10.84	Eta 2020	Planes de Montecristo	

== Fiji ==
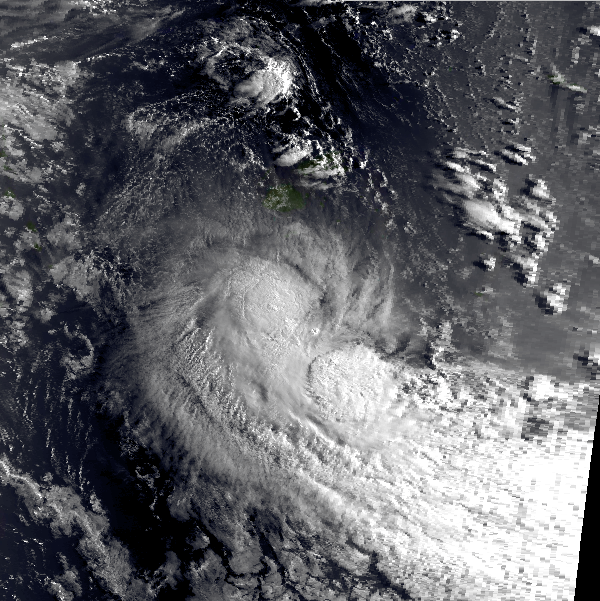
Cyclone Wally

Orography from the volcanic islands of Fiji has led to significant rainfall during tropical cyclone passages, which occur roughly once a year.

Wettest tropical cyclones and their remnants in Fiji Highest-known totals
Precipitation			Storm	Location	Ref.
Rank	mm	in	Storm	Location	Ref.
1	1,139	44.84	Wally (1980)	Sakisa	
2	1,040	40.94	Kina (1992-93)	Monasavu dam	
3	913	35.94	04F (2016)	Monasavu dam	
4	755	29.72	Bebe (1972)	Naseuvou	
5	744	29.29	Ana (2021)	Dreketilailai	
6	697	27.44	Gavin (1985)	Monasavu dam	
7	615	24.21	Gavin (1997)	Monasavu dam	
8	545	21.46	June (1997)	Matei	
9	535	21.06	14F (2016)	Nadarivatu	
10	529	20.83	Evan (2012)	Monasavu dam	

== France ==
=== French Polynesia ===
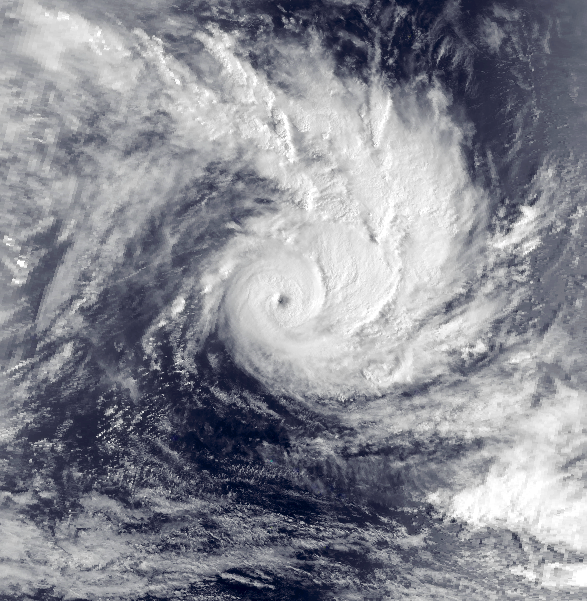
Cyclone Wasa

Wettest tropical cyclones and their remnants in French Polynesia Highest-known totals
Precipitation			Storm	Location	Ref.
Rank	mm	in	Storm	Location	Ref.
1	550	21.65	02F 1998	Tahiti	
2	356	14.02	Judy 2004	Takaroa	
3	241	9.49	Wasa 1991	Uturoa	
4	149	5.87	Pam 1997	Rarotonga	
5	62.1	2.44	Zita 2007	Rurutu	

=== Guadeloupe ===
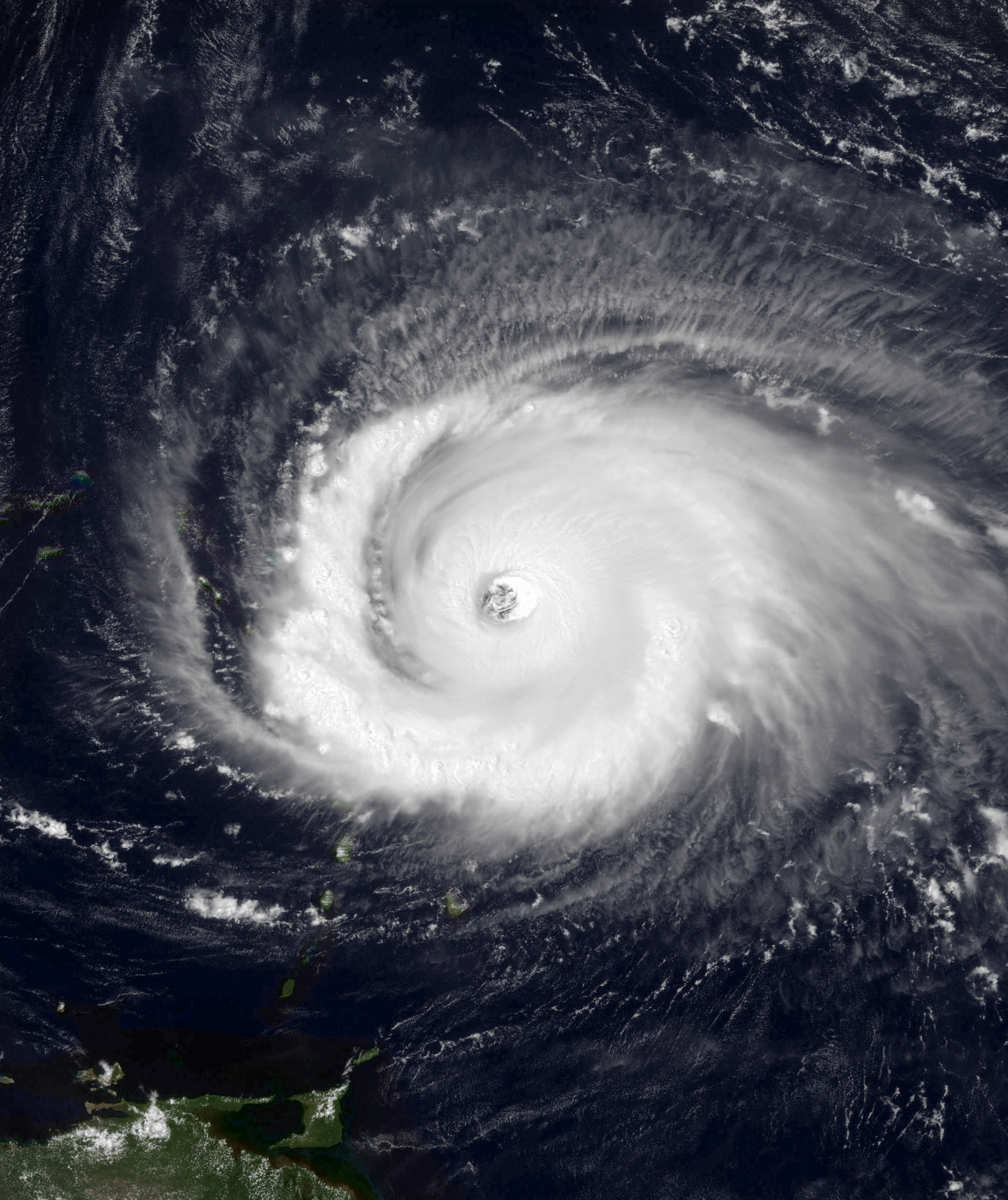
Hurricane Luis

Hurricane Marilyn moved directly across the island in mid-September 1995, bringing the highest known rainfall totals to the island from a tropical cyclone.

Wettest tropical cyclones and their remnants in Guadeloupe Highest-known totals
Precipitation			Storm	Location	Ref.
Rank	mm	in	Storm	Location	Ref.
1	582	22.91	Luis 1995	Dent de l'est (Soufrière)	
2	534	21.02	Fiona 2022	Saint-Claude	
3	508	20.00	Marilyn 1995	Saint-Claude	
4	466	18.35	Lenny 1999	Gendarmerie	
5	416	16.38	Philippe 2023	Vieux-Fort	
6	389	15.31	Hugo 1989		
7	318	12.52	Hortense 1996	Maison du Volcan	
8	300	11.81	Jeanne 2004		
9	223.3	8.79	Cleo 1964	Deshaies	
10	200	7.87	Erika 2009		

=== Martinique ===
Martinique is a mountainous island at the fringe of the eastern Caribbean Sea.

Wettest tropical cyclones and their remnants in Martinique Highest-known totals
Precipitation			Storm	Location	Ref.
Rank	mm	in	Storm	Location	Ref.
1	680.7	26.80	Dorothy 1970	Fourniols	
2	567.0	22.32	Klaus 1990	Le Morne-Rouge	
3	475.0	18.07	Beulah 1967	Les Anses-d'Arlets	
4	450.1	17.72	Iris 1995	Ducos	
5	349.0	13.74	David 1979	Saint-Joseph	
6	332.0	13.07	Dean 2007	Fort-de-France	
7	305.0	12.01	Cindy 1993	Le Prêcheur	
8	301.5	11.87	Edith 1963	Saint-Pierre	
9	280.0	11.02	Allen 1980	Grand-Rivière	
10	230.1	9.059	Marilyn 1995	Le Morne-Rouge	

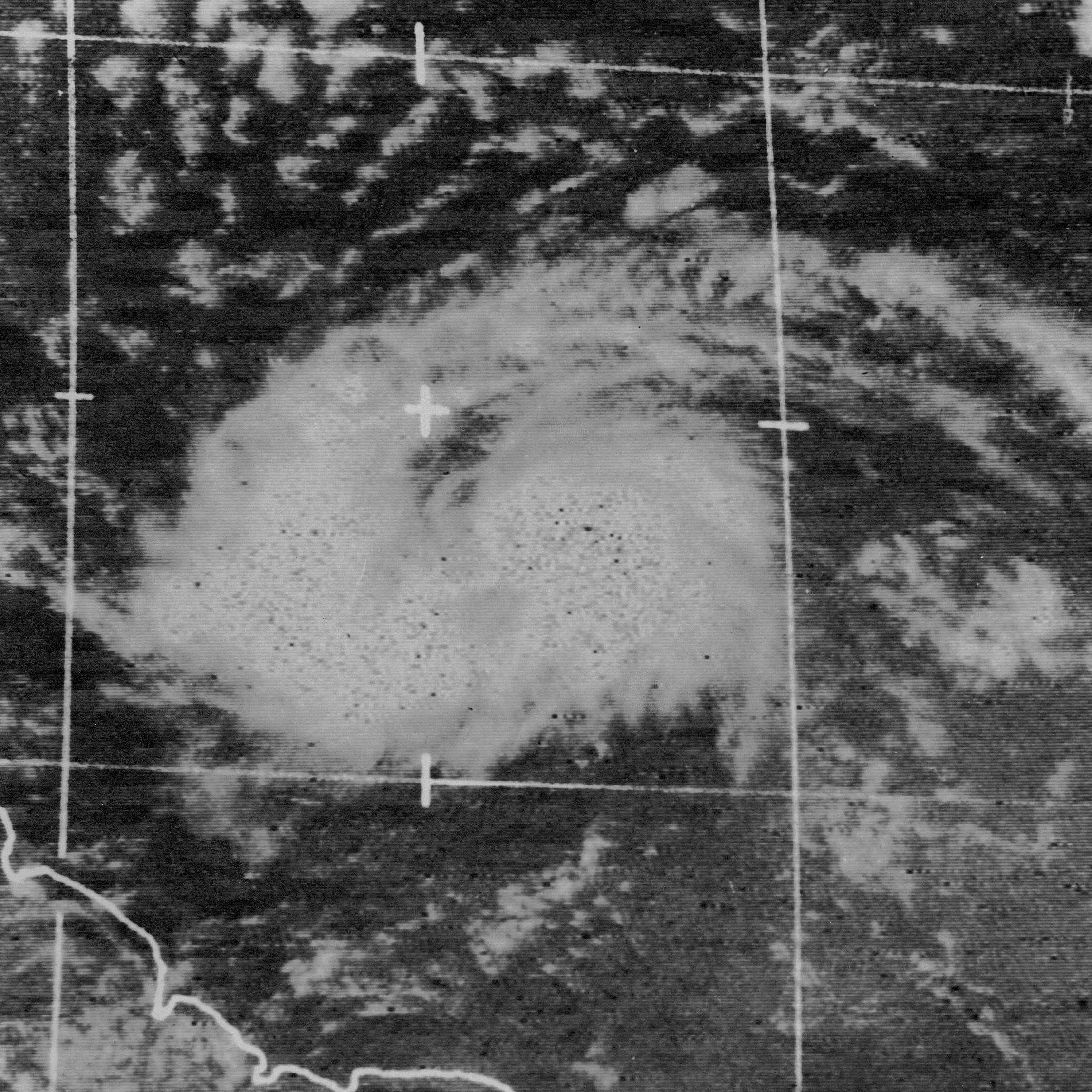
Tropical Storm Dorothy (1970)

=== New Caledonia ===
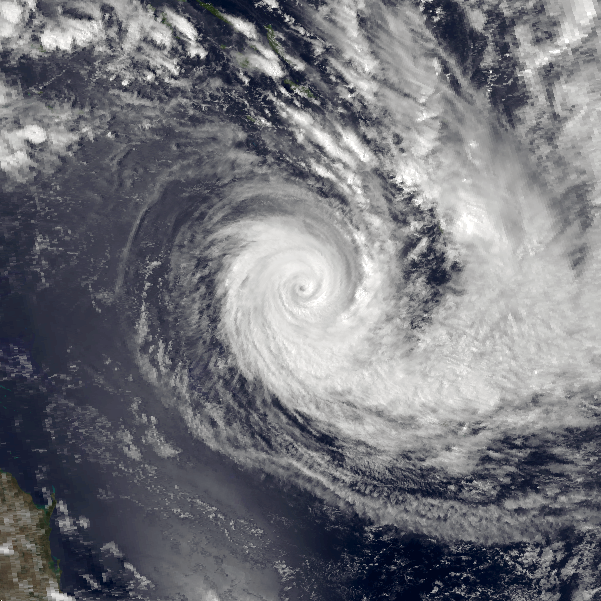
Cyclone Gyan

Wettest tropical cyclones and their remnants in New Caledonia Highest-known totals
Precipitation			Storm	Location	Ref.
Rank	mm	in	Storm	Location	Ref.
1	813	32.01	Gyan 1981	La Ouinné	
2	750	29.53	Beatrice 1959	Tiwaka	
3	713	28.07	Anne 1988	Goro	
4	620	24.41	Unnamed 1962	Houaïlou	
5	528	20.79	Esau 1992	Kopéto	
6	474	18.66	Drena 1997	Dzumac	
7	450	17.72	Vania 2011	Goro (Station Vale NC)	
8	414	16.30	Frank 1999	Tango (Chaîne)	
9	411	16.18	Cliff 1981	La Ouinné	
10	409	16.10	Cook 2017	Thio-Plateau	

=== Réunion Island ===
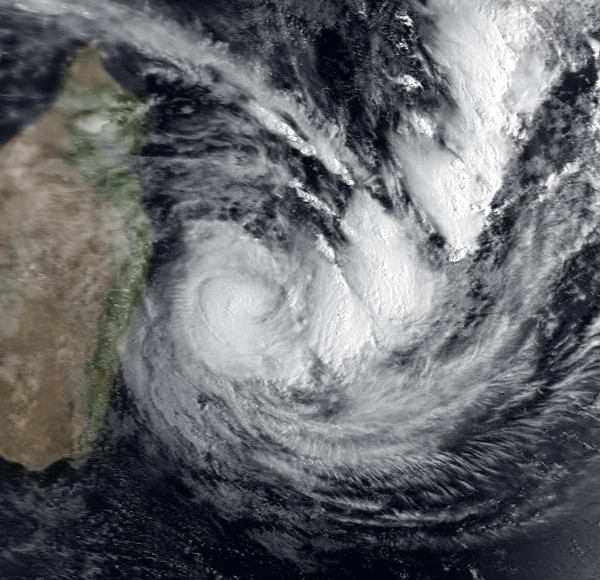
Cyclone Hyacinthe.

The mountainous island of Réunion has experienced several of the highest rainfall totals on record from tropical cyclones and holds the rainfall world records for 12, 24, 48, 72 hours, four, five, six, seven, eight, nine and ten days as a result. The 12 and 24 hourly rainfall records were set at Foc-Foc by Cyclone Denise in 1966, while an Unnamed Tropical Cyclone between April 8–10, 1958 set the record for 48 hours at Aurere. Tropical Cyclone Gamede between February 24–28, 2007 came close to beating the records for 12, 24 and 48 hours before setting the records for three, four, five, six, seven, eight and nine days that were held by Tropical Cyclone Hyacinthe 1980. Hyacinthe currently holds the world records for ten and fifteen days with rainfall totals of 5,678 millimetres (223.5 in) and 6,083 millimetres (239.5 in) respectively recorded at Commerson Crater.

Wettest tropical cyclones and their remnants on Reunion island Highest-known totals
Precipitation			Storm	Location	Ref.
Rank	mm	in	Storm	Location	Ref.
1	6,433	253.27	Hyacinthe 1980	Commerson	
2	5,512	217.01	Gamede 2007	Commerson	
3	2,958	116.46	Diwa 2006	Grand-Ilet	
4	2,044	80.472	Batsirai 2022	Commerson	
5	1,825	71.85	Denise 1966	Foc-Foc	
6	1,360	53.54	Dina 2002	Bellecombe	
7	1,309	51.54	Firinga 1989	Pas de Bellecombe	
8	1,196	47.09	Gael 2009	Commerson	
9	1,196	47.09	Florine 1981	Foc-Foc	
10	1,025	40.35	Bejisa 2013	Cilaos	

=== Saint Martin ===
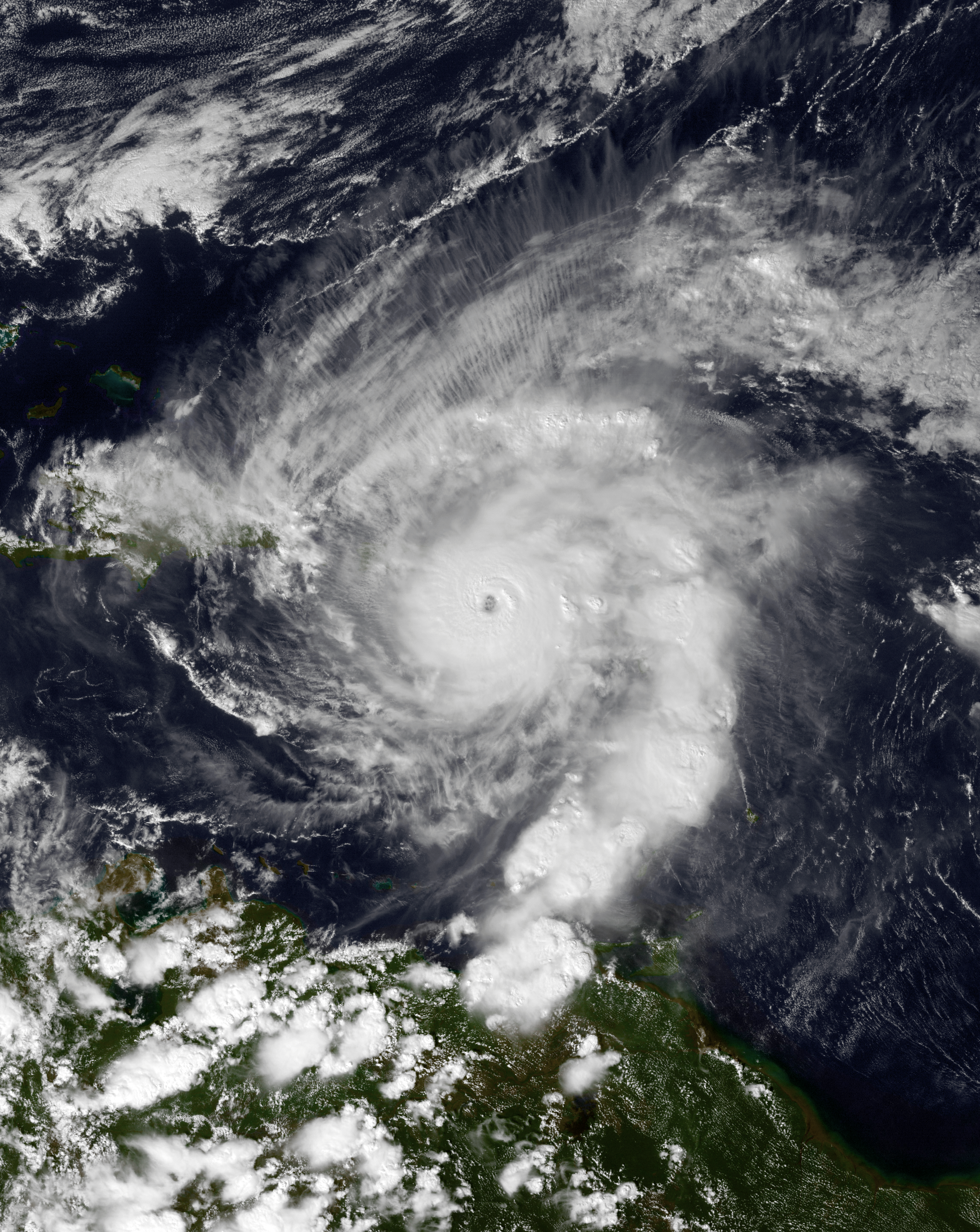
Hurricane Lenny

Wettest tropical cyclones and their remnants in Saint Martin Highest-known totals
Precipitation			Storm	Location	Ref.
Rank	mm	in	Storm	Location	Ref.
1	866.6	34.12	Lenny 1999	Gendarmerie	
2	349.3	13.75	Jose 1999	Point Blanche	
3	328.7	12.94	Otto 2010	Charlotte Amalie	
4	98.0	3.86	Earl 2010	Grand Case	
6	85.1	3.35	Marilyn 1995		

=== Wallis and Futuna ===
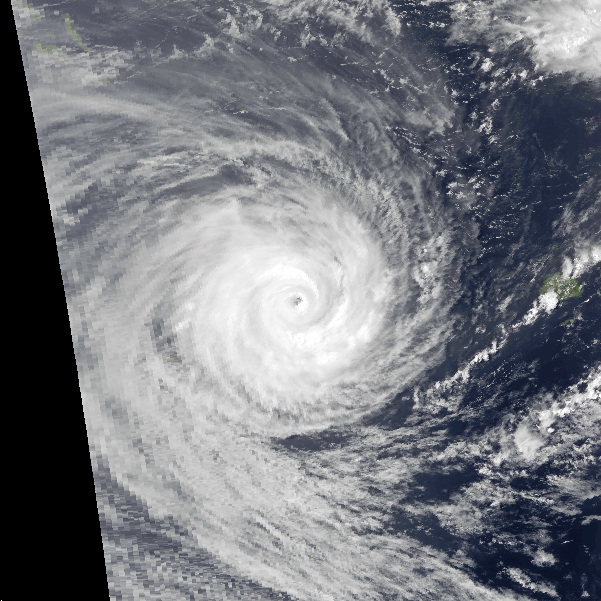
Cyclone Fran

Wettest tropical cyclones and their remnants in Wallis and Futuna Highest-known totals
Precipitation			Storm	Location	Ref.
Rank	mm	in	Storm	Location	Ref.
1	674.9	26.57	Raja 1986	Maopoopo, Futuna Island	
2	556.7	21.92	Fran 1992	Hihifo, Wallis Island	
3	291.2	11.46	Val 1975	Hihifo, Wallis Island	
4	220.6	8.69	Hina 1997	Maopoopo, Futuna Island	
5	186.0	7.32	Evan 2012	Futuna Island	
6	180.0	7.09	Val 1980	Maopoopo, Futuna Island	
7	171.6	6.76	Keli 1997	Hihifo, Wallis Island	
8	160.8	6.33	Unnamed 1966	Malaetoli, Wallis Island	
9	160.0	6.30	Amos 2016	Hihifo, Wallis Island	
10	119.0	4.69	Waka 2001	Hihifo, Wallis Island	

== Guatemala ==
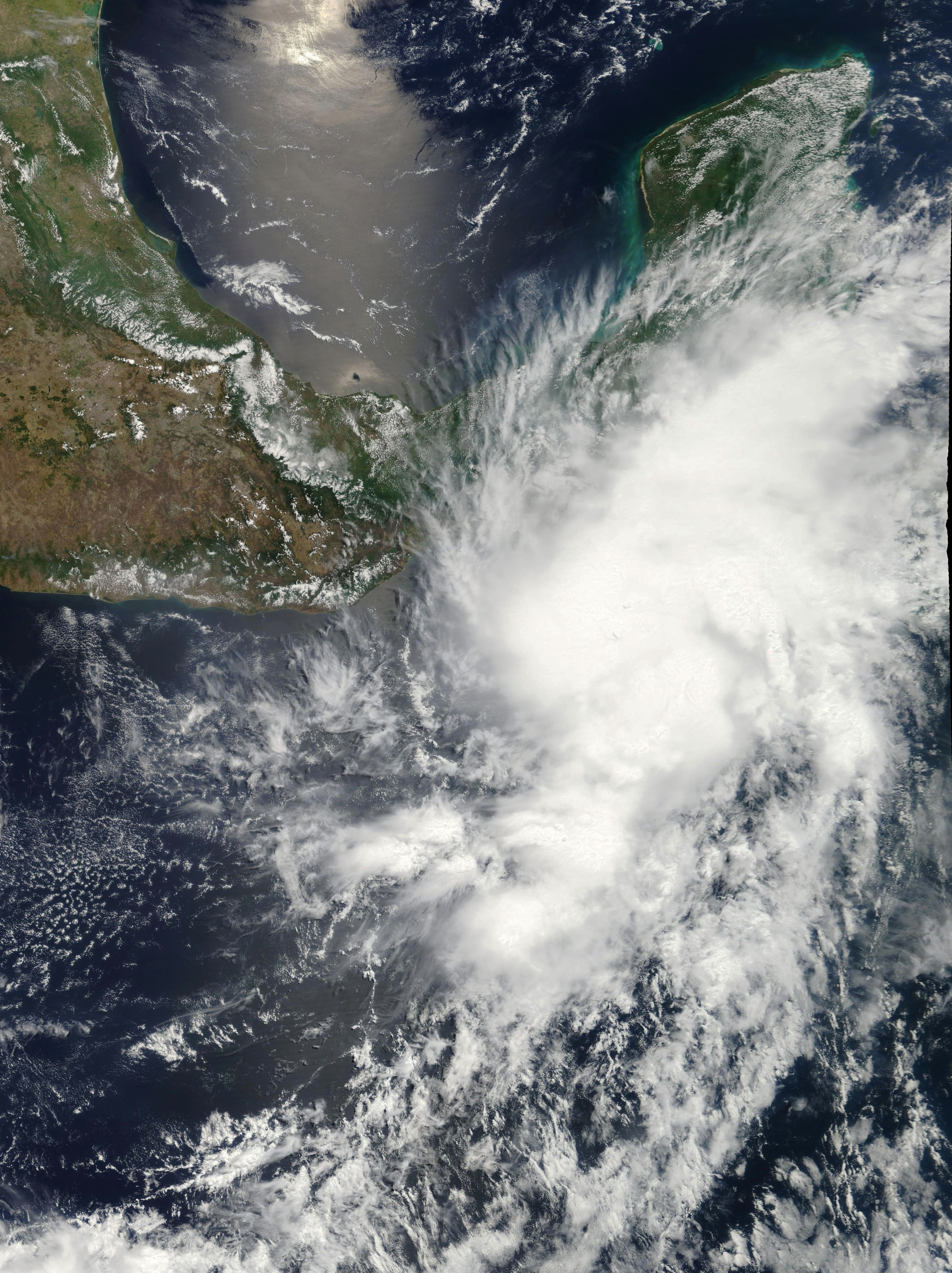
Tropical Storm Agatha (2010)

Tropical Storm Agatha in May 2010 became the second-wettest tropical cyclone in the nation's history when it slowly developed while remaining nearly stationary to the southwest of Guatemala, before turning northeast and dissipating across inland Central America.

Wettest tropical cyclones and their remnants Guatemala Highest-known totals
Precipitation			Storm	Location	Ref.
Rank	mm	in	Storm	Location	Ref.
1	600	23.62	Mitch 1998	Central Sierra de las Minas	
2	565.6	22.62	Agatha 2010	Mazatenango	
3	534.8	21.06	Eta 2020	Cobán	
4	299.7	11.8	Amanda 2020	Jutiapa	
5	~250	~9.84	Stan 2005		
6	~200	~7.87	Adrian 2005		
7	184.6	7.27	Francelia 1969		

== Haiti ==
Haiti that makes up three-eighths of Hispaniola, is a mountainous country that has experienced some of the most powerful hurricanes on record, including Hurricane David. Its three mountain ranges have peaks as high as 8793 feet/2680 meters above sea level.

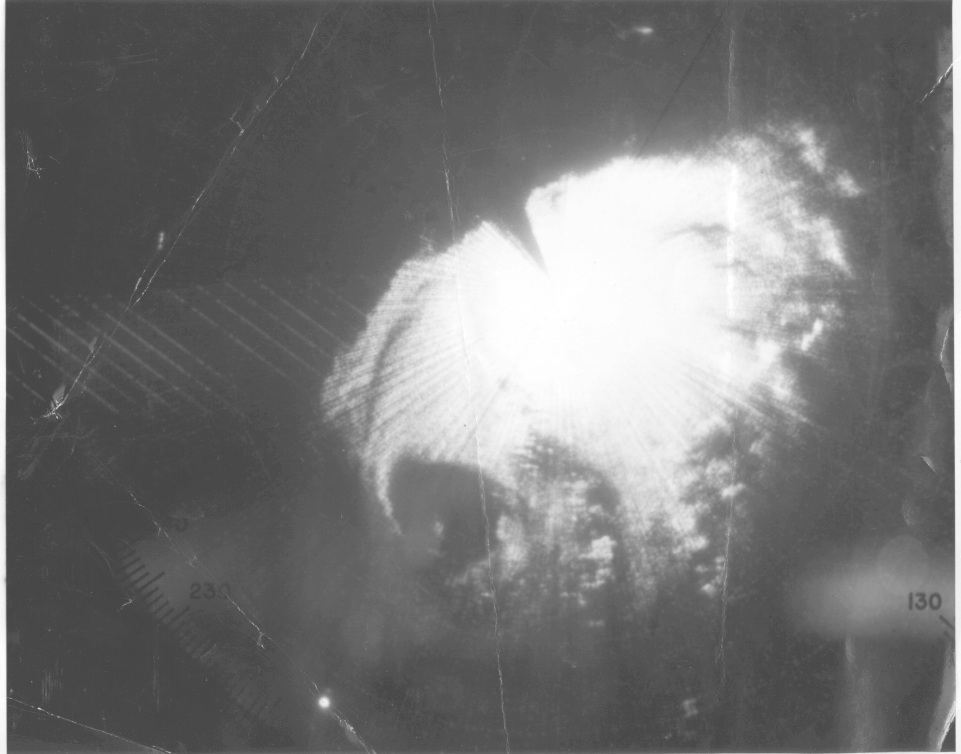
Hurricane Flora

Wettest tropical cyclones and their remnants in Haiti Highest-known totals
Precipitation			Storm	Location	Ref.
Rank	mm	in	Storm	Location	Ref.
1	1,447.8	57.00	Flora 1963	Miragoâne	
2	934.0	36.77	Melissa 2025	Camp Perrin	
3	654.8	25.78	Noel 2007	Camp Perrin	
4	604.5	23.80	Matthew 2016	Anse-á-Veau	
5	410.0	16.14	Lili 2002	Camp Perrin	
6	323.0	12.72	Hanna 2008	Camp Perrin	
7	273.0	10.75	Gustav 2008	Camp Perrin	
8	168.0	6.614	Laura 2020	Port-Au-Prince	
9	65.0	2.56	Fox 1952	Ouanaminthe	

== Honduras ==
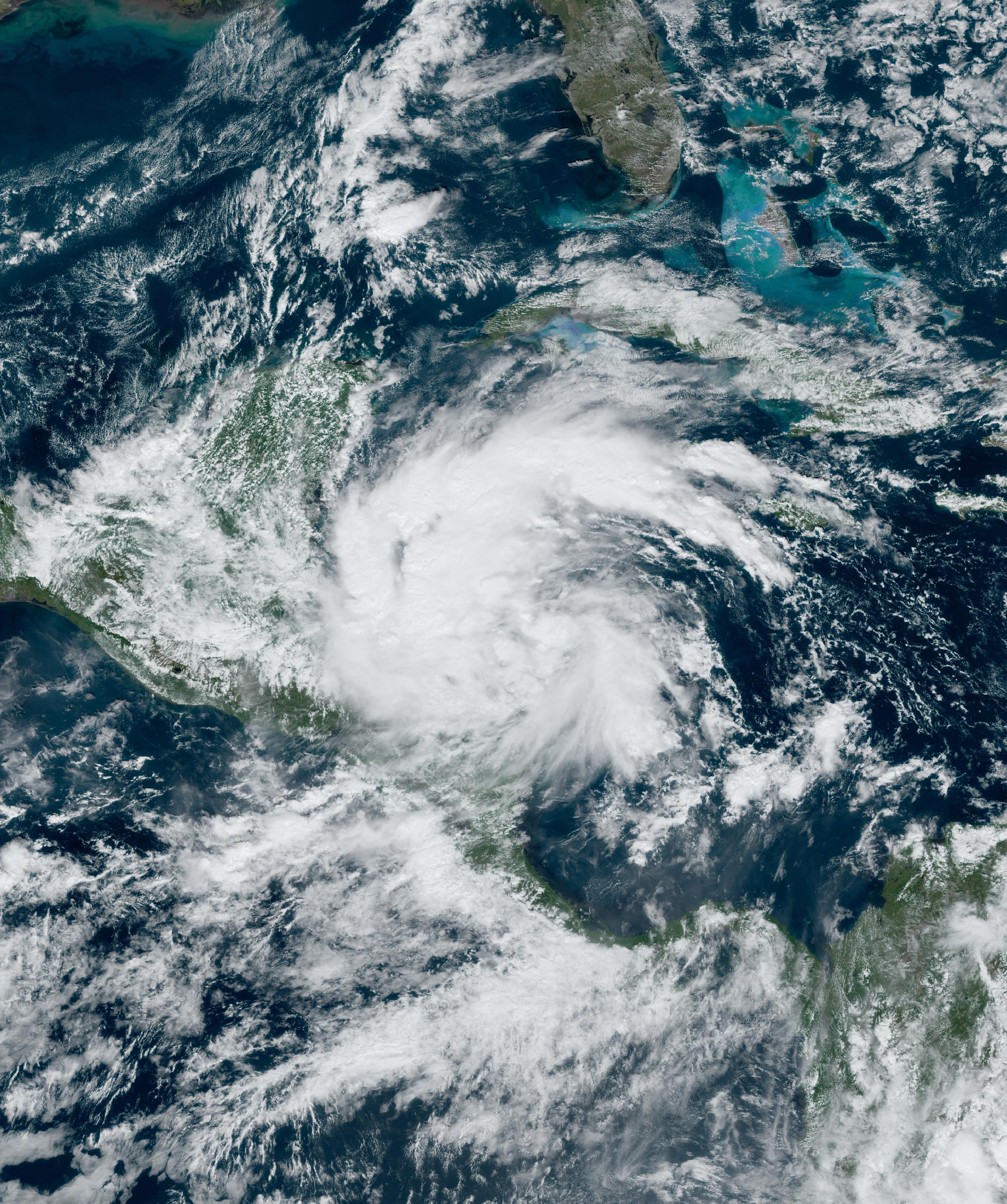
Tropical Storm Sara

Wettest tropical cyclones and their remnants Honduras Highest-known totals
Precipitation			Storm	Location	Ref.
Rank	mm	in	Storm	Location	Ref.
1	1,016	40.00	Sara 2024	La Ceiba	
2	912	35.89	Mitch 1998	Choluteca	
3	803	31.63	Eta 2020	Tela, Atlántida	
4	760	29.92	Alma 1966	San Rafael	
5	610	24.00	Fifi 1974		
6	554	21.82	Beta 2005	Trujillo	
7	360	14.19	T.D. #16 2008	Roatán	
8	301	11.85	Iota 2020	La Ceiba	
9	244	9.62	Felix 2007	Omoa	
10	192	7.56	Nana 2020	Roatan	

=== Swan Island ===
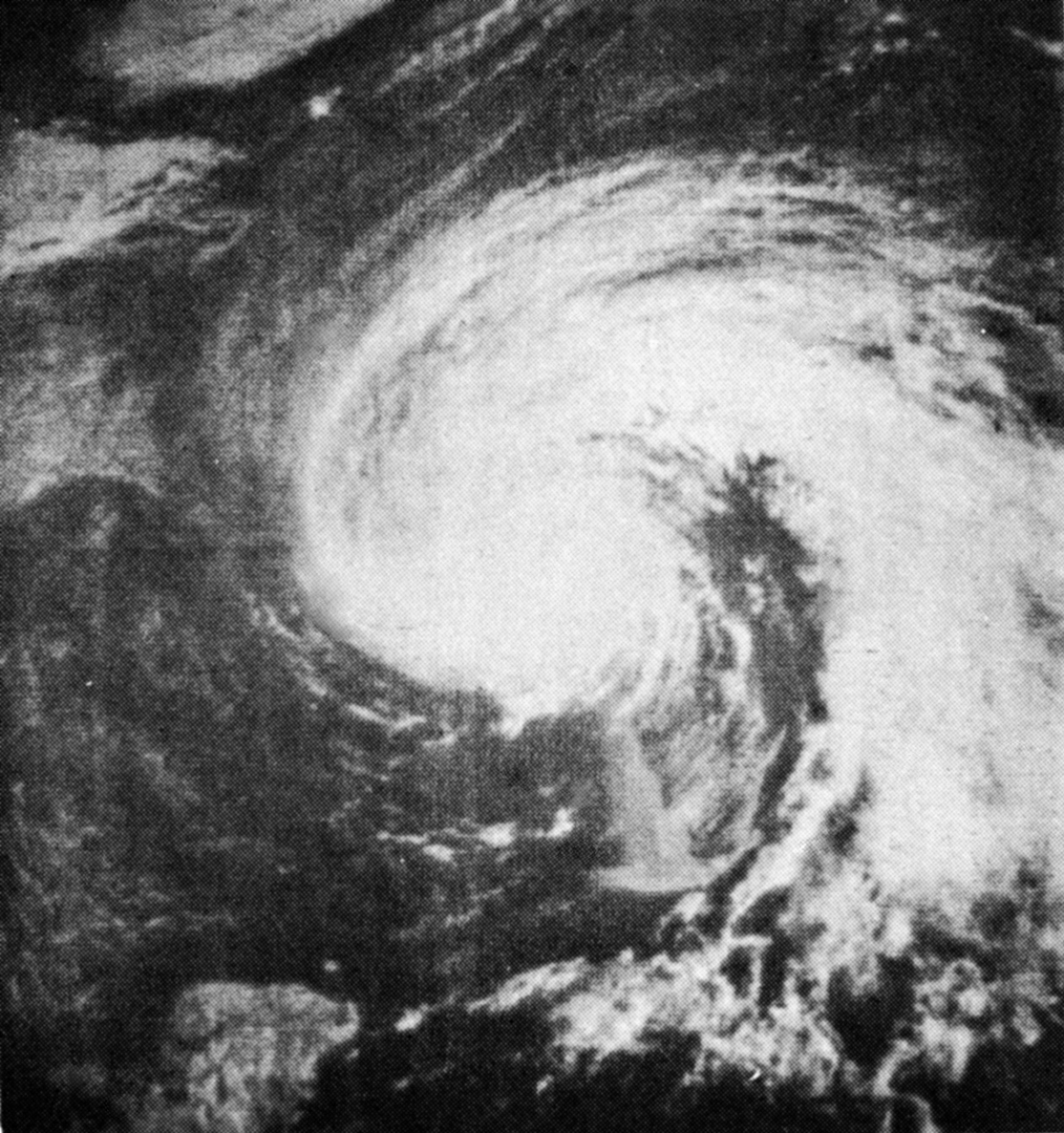
Hurricane Alma (1966)

Wettest tropical cyclones and their remnants on Swan Island Highest-known totals
Precipitation			Storm	Location	Ref.
Rank	mm	in	Storm	Location	Ref.
1	362.7	14.28	Alma 1966		
2	228.9	9.01	Debbie 1965		
3	220.0	8.66	Ella 1970		
4	178.6	7.03	Laurie 1969		
5	167.1	6.58	Isbell 1964		
6	105.2	4.14	Beulah 1967		
7	98.8	3.89	Carla 1961		
8	90.7	3.57	Francelia 1969		
9	87.1	3.43	Hattie 1961		
10	80.5	3.17	Fox 1952		

== India ==
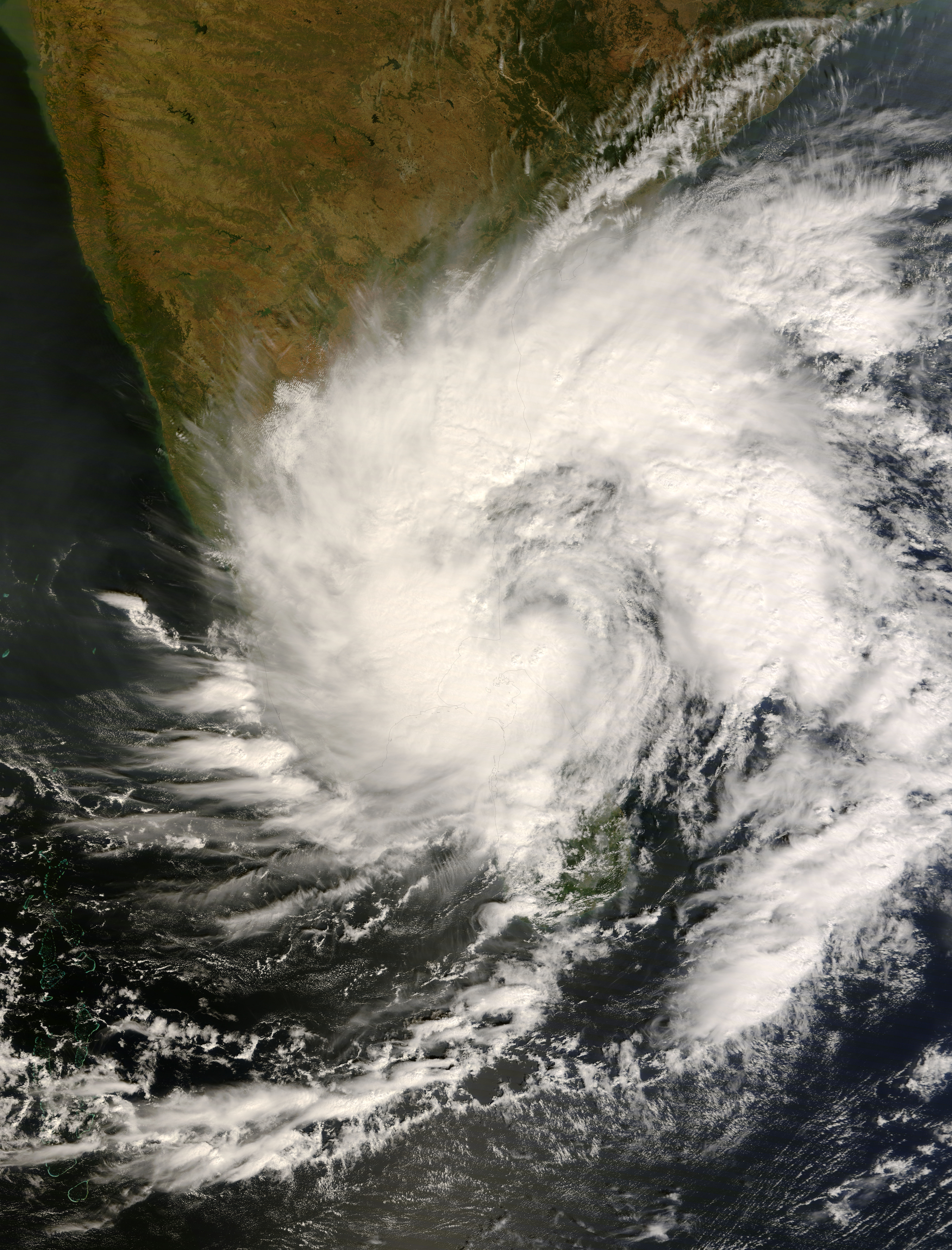
Cyclone Nisha

India can be struck by cyclones that form in the Bay of Bengal or the Arabian Sea.

Wettest tropical cyclones and their remnants in India Highest-known totals
Precipitation			Storm	Location	Ref.
Rank	mm	in	Storm	Location	Ref.
1	2,300	90.55	1968 Severe Cyclonic Storm	Pedong, West Bengal	
2	1,840	72.44	Severe Cyclonic Storm ARB 01 (2004)	Aminidivi, Lakshadweep	
3	1,340	52.76	Depression Six (1961)	Cherrapunji, Meghalaya	
4	1280	50.39	Nisha (2008)	Orathanadu, Tamil Nadu	
5	1171	46.10	Phyan (2009)	Kethi, Tamil Nadu	
6	1030	40.55	Ogni (2006)	Avanigadda, Andhra Pradesh	
7	953	37.52	1943 Severe Cyclonic Storm	Cuddalore, Tamil Nadu	
8	910	35.83	Deep Depression Four (1963)	Cherrapunji, Meghalaya	
9	810	31.89	Cyclone 12 (1959)	Bano	
10	800	31.50	Cyclone 5 (1968)	Harnai	

== Indonesia ==
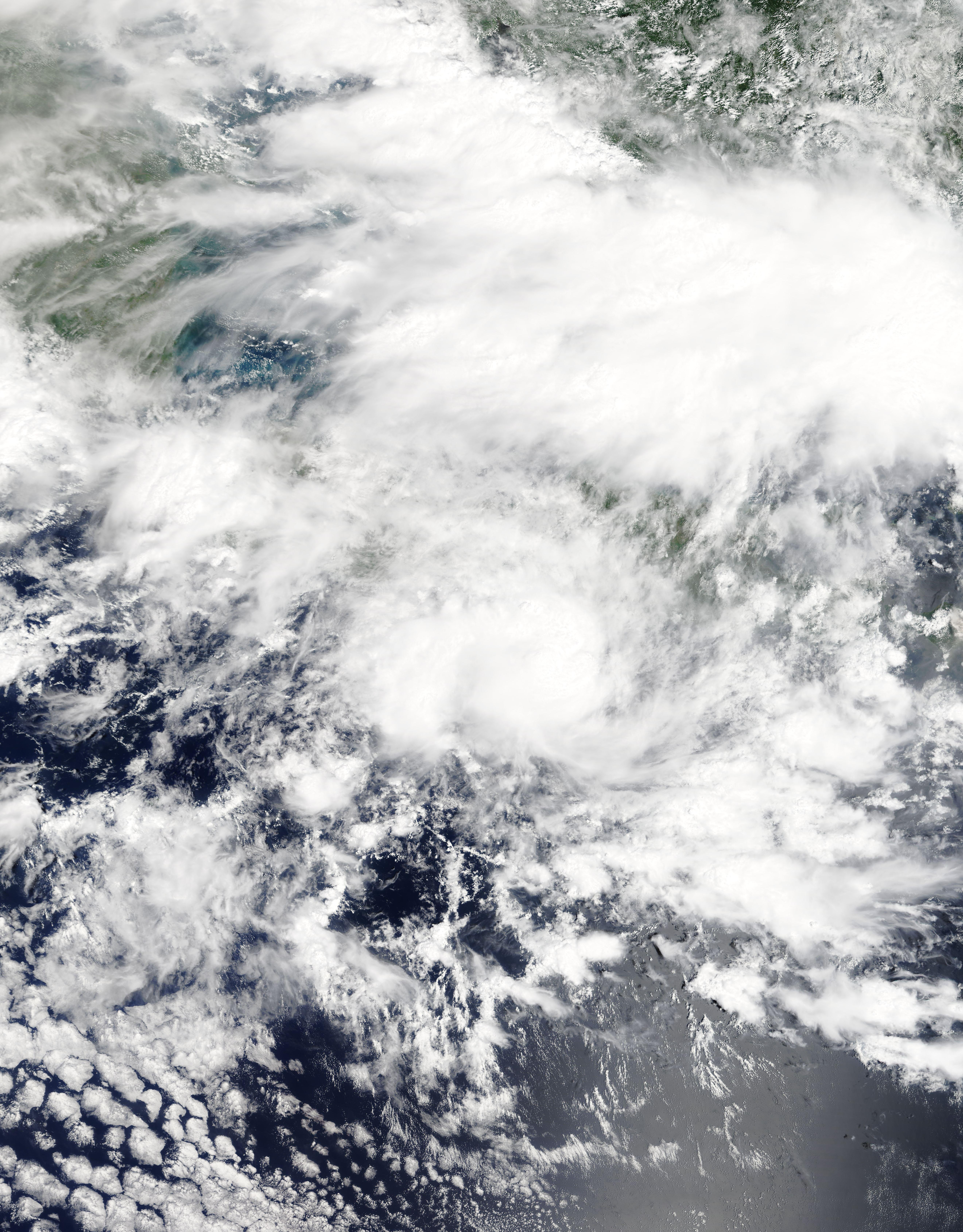
Cyclone Cempaka

The precursor tropical disturbance of Tropical Cyclone Inigo in April 2003 dropped heavy rainfall in eastern Indonesia. The rainfall caused flash flooding and mudslides, primarily in Flores but also on West Timor and Sumba. In some locations, the depth of the floodwaters reached 5 metres (16 ft). The Oessao River in West Timor exceeded its banks, which flooded seven villages. In Kupang in West Timor, the system destroyed hundreds of homes and large fields of corn, bean, and rice crop. Heavy damage was reported near Ende, where flooding and mudslides destroyed 20 houses and destroyed the roads connecting to East Flores. The city airport was flooded with one meter (3 ft) of water, preventing aerial transportation and which left the city temporarily isolated. In East Flores Regency in eastern Flores Island, the system left 75 destroyed houses, along with 77 severely damaged and a further 56 receiving light damage.

Wettest tropical cyclones and their remnants in Indonesia Highest-known totals
Precipitation			Storm	Location	Ref.
Rank	mm	in	Storm	Location	Ref.
1	383	15.1	Cempaka 2017	Pacitan, East Java	
2	223	8.78	Inigo 2003	Larantuka, Flores	
3	193	7.6	Kirrily 2009	Tual, Maluku Province	
4	159.7	6.29	Seroja 2021	Kalabahi, Alor Island	
5	148	5.8	17U 2019	Yogyakarta	

== Iran ==
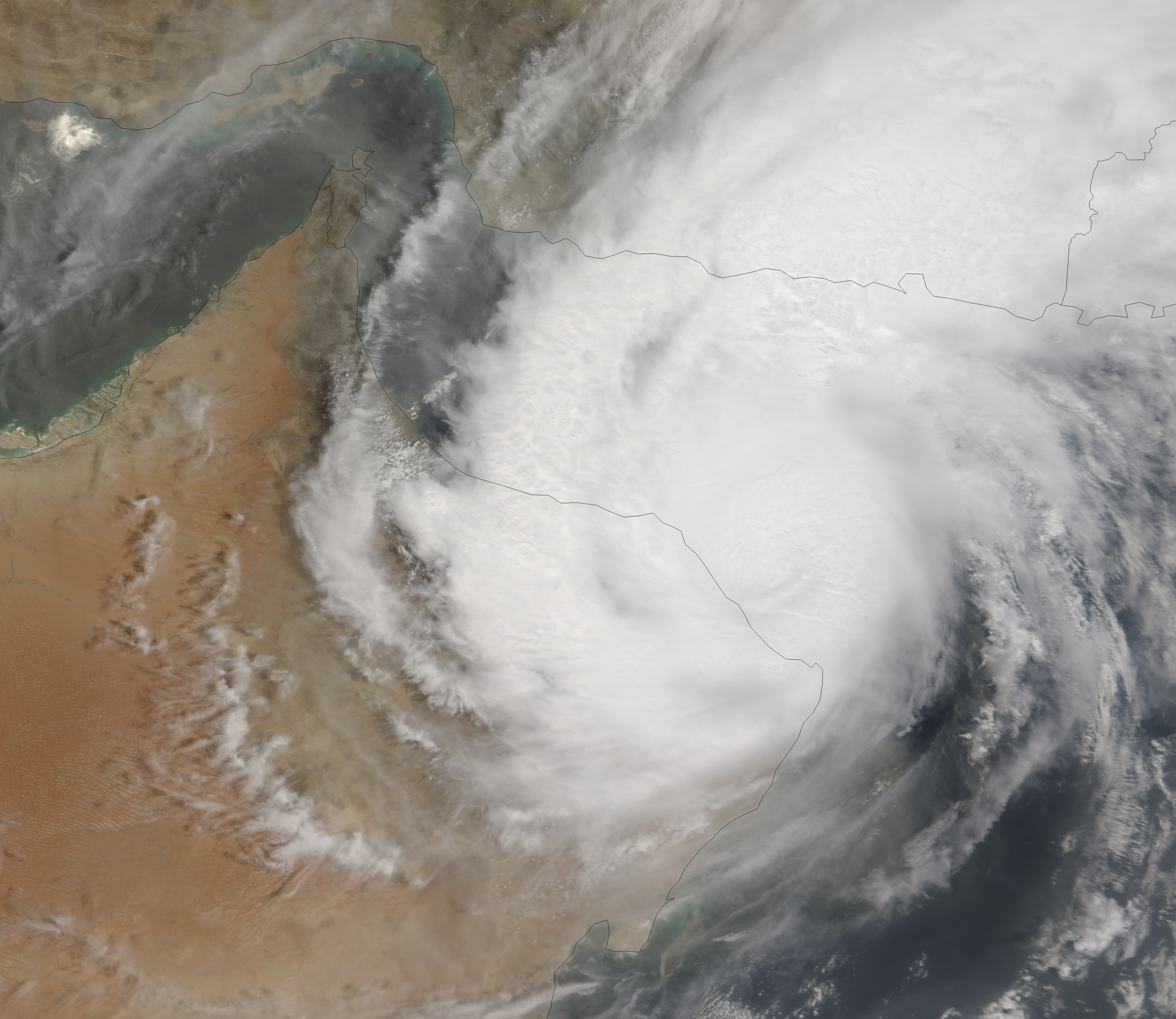
Cyclone Gonu

Wettest tropical cyclones and their remnants in Iran Highest-known totals
Precipitation			Storm	Location	Ref.
Rank	mm	in	Storm	Location	Ref.
1	74 mm	2.91 inches	Gonu 2007	Chabahar	

== Jamaica ==
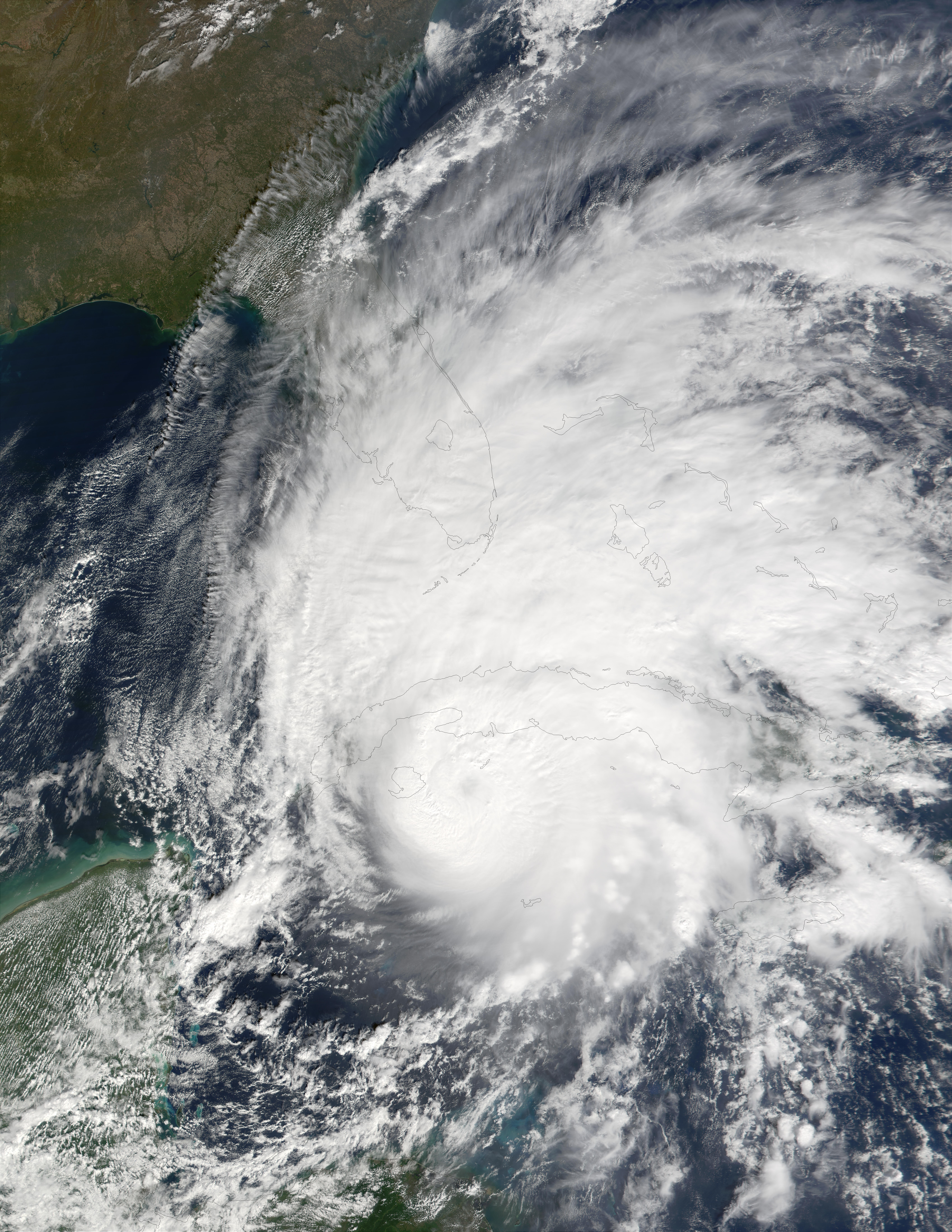
Hurricane Michelle

This mountainous island country of Jamaica can get lashed with rainfall by slow-moving tropical cyclones in the western Caribbean Sea. Its interior, the Blue Mountains, reach a height of 7,400 feet (2,300 m) above sea level.

Wettest tropical cyclones and their remnants in Jamaica Highest-known totals
Precipitation			Storm	Location	Ref.
Rank	mm	in	Storm	Location	Ref.
1	3429.0	135.00	Nov. 1909 Hurricane	Silver Hill Plantation	
2	1524.0	60.00	Flora 1963	Silver Hill	
3	1057.9	41.65	Michelle 2001		
4	950.0	37.42	Nicole 2010	Negril	
5	938.3	36.94	Gilda 1973	Top Mountain	
6	863.6	34.00	June 1979 T.D.	Western Jamaica	
7	823.0	32.40	Gilbert 1988	Interior mountains	
8	817.1	32.17	Melissa 2025	Knock Patrick	
9	733.8	28.89	Eta 2020	Moore Town, Jamaica	
10	720.6	28.37	Ivan 2004	Ritchies	

== Japan ==
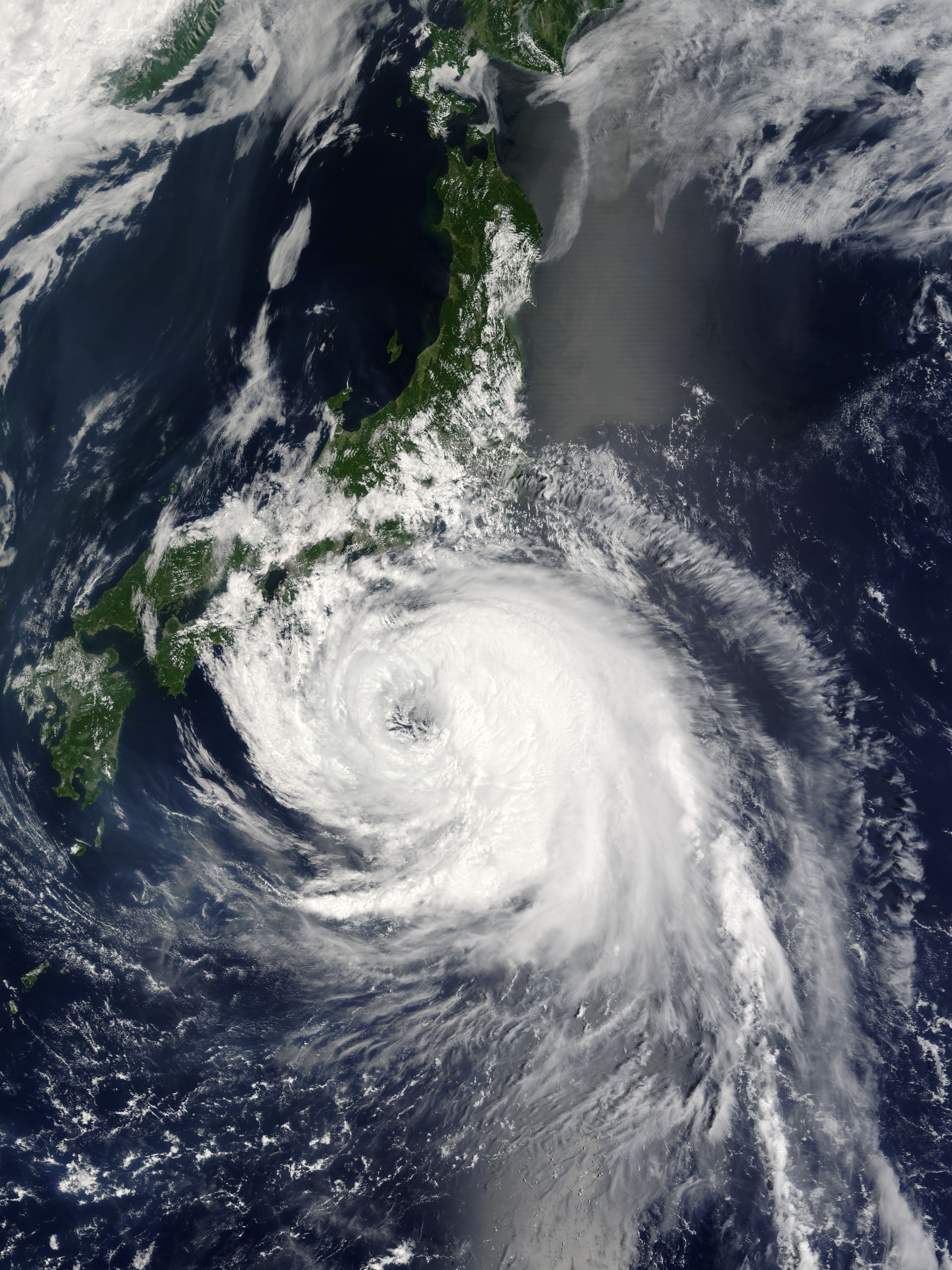
Typhoon Namtheun approaching Japan on July 30, 2004

The mountainous island archipelago is constantly struck by typhoons recurving out of the tropics, which are normally in extratropical transition as they pass through Japan. Typhoon Namtheun of the 2004 Pacific typhoon season holds the national 24-hour precipitation record with 1,317 millimetres (51.9 in) observed in Kisawa village, surpassing the previous record of 1,140 mm (45 in) set during Typhoon Fran in 1976.

Wettest tropical cyclones and their remnants in Japan Highest-known totals
Precipitation			Storm	Location	Ref.
Rank	mm	in	Storm	Location	Ref.
1	2781.0	109.50	Fran 1976	Hiso	
2	>2000.0	>78.74	Namtheun 2004	Kisawa	
3	1805.5	71.08	Talas 2011	Kamikitayama	
4	1518.9	59.80	Olive 1971	Ebino	
5	1322.0	52.04	Nabi 2005	Mikado	
6	1286.0	50.62	Kent 1992	Hidegadake	
7	1167.0	45.94	Judy 1989	Hidegadake	
8	1138.0	44.80	Abby 1983	Amagisan	
9	1124.0	44.25	Flo 1990	Yanase	
10	~1092.0	~43.00	Trix 1971	Yangitake	

=== Okinawa ===
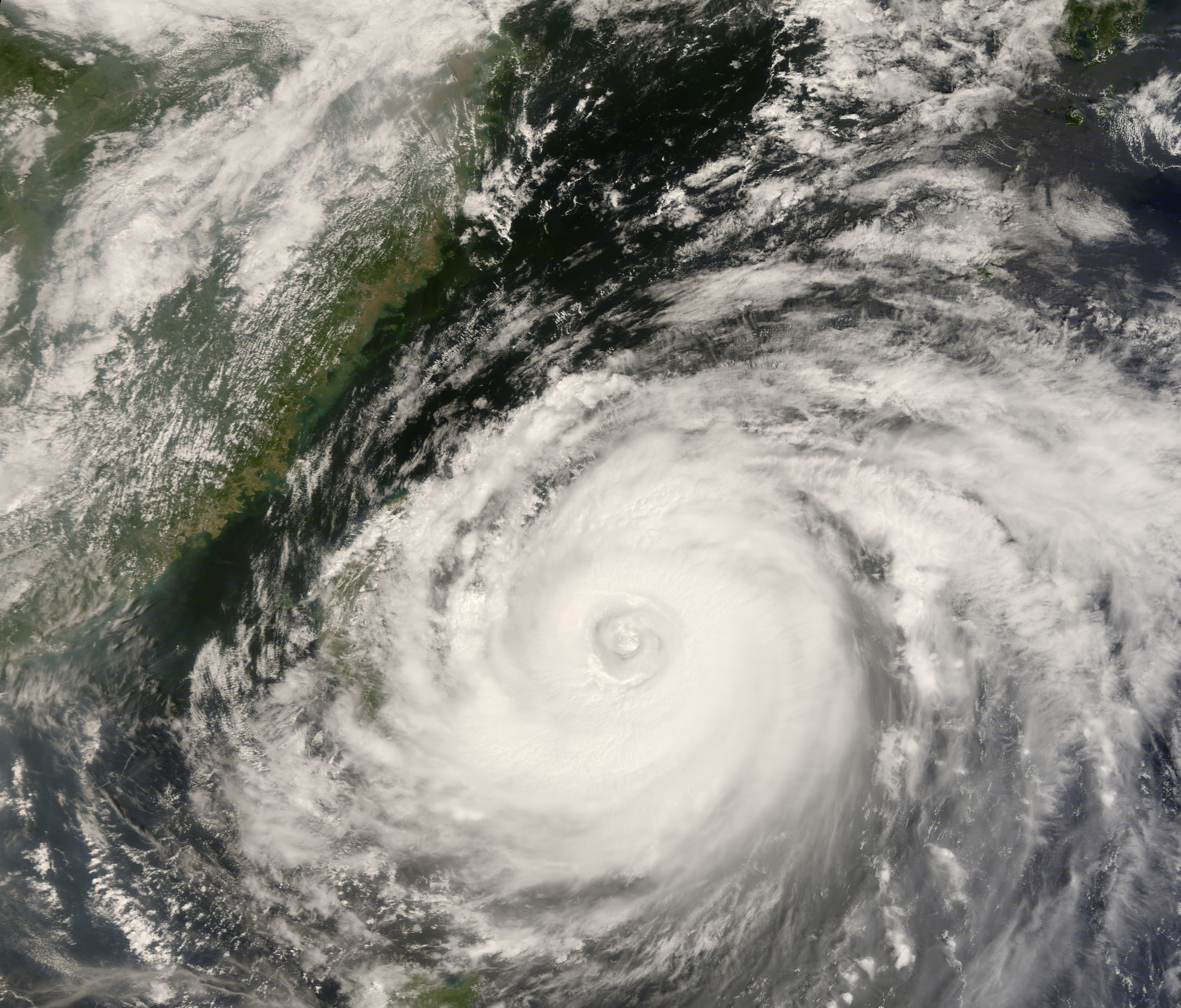
Typhoon Sinlaku near Okinawa on September 12, 2008

Wettest tropical cyclones and their remnants in Okinawa Highest-known totals
Precipitation			Storm	Location	Ref.
Rank	mm	in	Storm	Location	Ref.
1	1065.0	41.92	Sinlaku 2008	Yonagunijima	
2	1059.0	41.70	Emma 1956	Kadena Air Force Base	
3	1014.0	41.00	Muifa 2011		
4	575.6	22.66	Charlotte 1959	Naha Air Force Base	
5	535.0	21.06	Bolaven 2012	Kunigami	
6	473.7	18.65	Cora 1969	Kadena Air Force Base	
7	452.0	17.80	Sinlaku 2002	Oku	
8	407.2	16.03	Grace 1961	Kadena Air Force Base	
9	345.0	13.50	Conson 2004	Tarama	
10	342.0	13.46	Kujira 2003		

=== Ryukyu Islands ===
Typhoon Rusa caused 409 millimetres (16.1 in) of rain to fall at Naze on August 29–30, 2002. Typhoon Aere dropped 314.5 millimetres (12.38 in) of rain in the 65‑hour period ending at 1400 UTC on August 25, 2004, at Ishigakihima. Typhoon Agnes in August 1957 dropped 586.2 millimetres (23.08 in) of rainfall on Marcus Island. In 1972, Typhoon Rita dumped 31.87 in (809 mm) on Okinoerabu Shima.

== Johnston Atoll ==
Tropical cyclones occasionally threaten this central Pacific island. Hurricane Celeste of 1972 brought 6.21 inches (158 mm) to the isle around August 19.

== Korea ==
The Korean Peninsula experiences typhoons regularly. Tropical cyclones which impact southern China also lead to, on average, five heavy rainfall events per year across the Korean peninsula.

=== North Korea ===
Very heavy rains fell across Tongchon and Kosong counties during Typhoon Rusa in 2002, where up to 510 millimetres (20 in) of precipitation fell in a 5- to 10-hour period.

=== South Korea ===
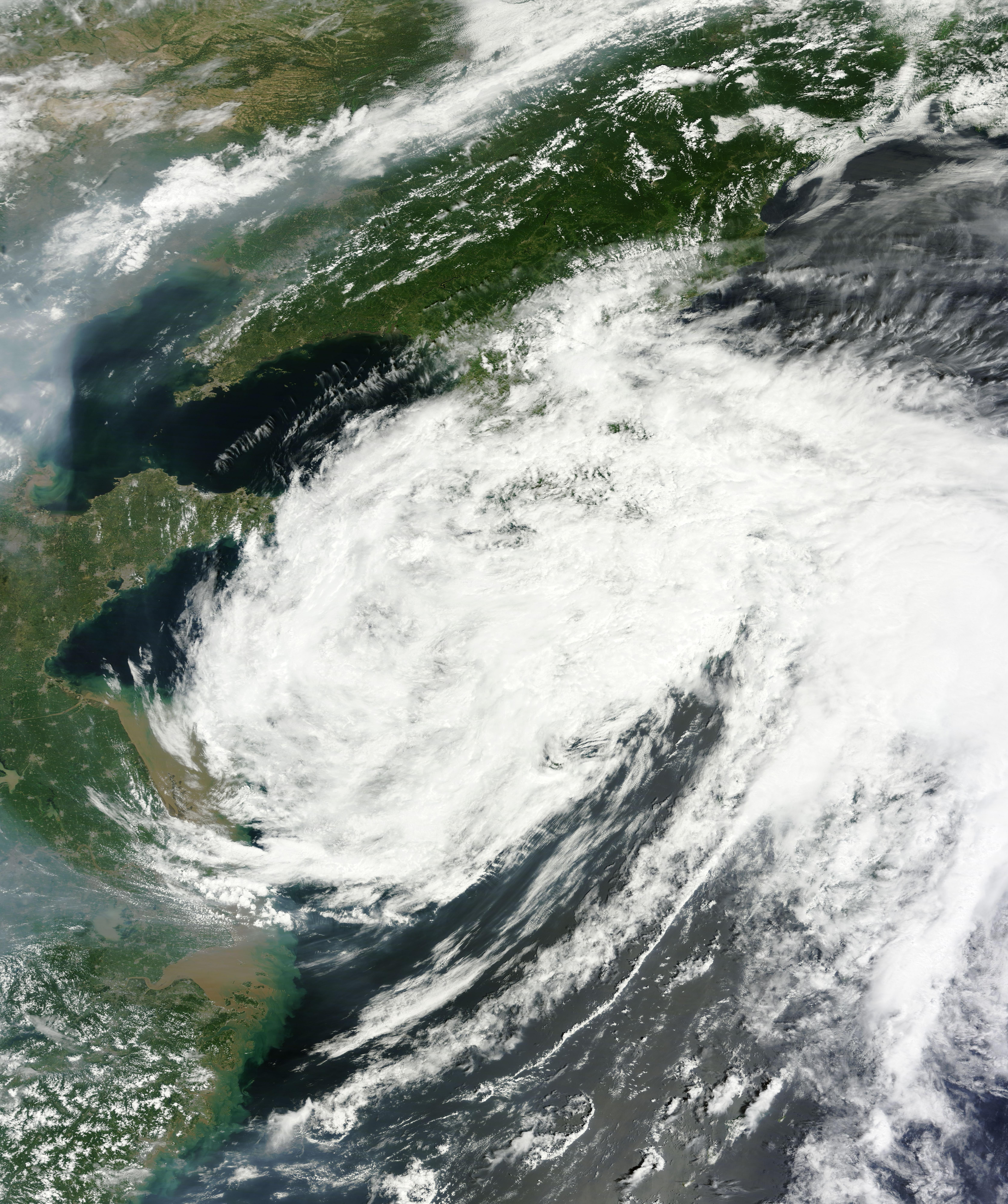
Severe Tropical Storm Nakri

Wettest tropical cyclones and their remnants in South Korea Highest-known totals
Precipitation			Storm	Location	Ref.
Rank	mm	in	Storm	Location	Ref.
1	>1,500	>59.05	Nakri 2014	Mount Halla, Jeju Island	
2	>1,300	>51.18	Chanthu 2021	Mount Halla, Jeju Island	
3	1250.5	49.23	Chan-hom 2015	Mount Halla, Jeju Island	
4	898.0	35.35	Rusa 2002	Gangneung	
5	710.0	28.00	Agnes 1981		
6	660.4	26.00	Gladys 1991		
7	634.0	24.96	Muifa 2011	Eorimok	
8	590.0	23.23	Nari 2007	Jeju	
9	491.0	19.33	Saomai 2000		
10	374.0	14.72	Meari 2011	Boeun	

== Madagascar ==
Cyclone Kesiny

The north end of the island, known as the Tsaratanana Massif region, contains terrain with elevations up to 9417 feet/2880 meters.

Wettest tropical cyclones and their remnants in Madagascar Highest-known totals
Precipitation			Storm	Location	Ref.
Rank	mm	in	Storm	Location	Ref.
1	891.0	35.07	Kesiny 2002	Toamasina	
2	715.0	28.14	Elita 2004		
3	707.0	27.8	Guillaume 2002	Toamasina	
4	355.2	13.9	Indlala 2007	Antalaha	
5	300.0	12.0	Cela 2003		
6	279.4	11.0	Chanda 2012		
7	261.0	10.2	Ivan 2008	Toamasina	
8	255.4	10.0	Gafilo 2004	Nosy-be	
9	237.2	9.3	Ernest 2005	Toliara	
10	229.0	9.0	Jade 2009	Toamasina	

== Malaysia ==
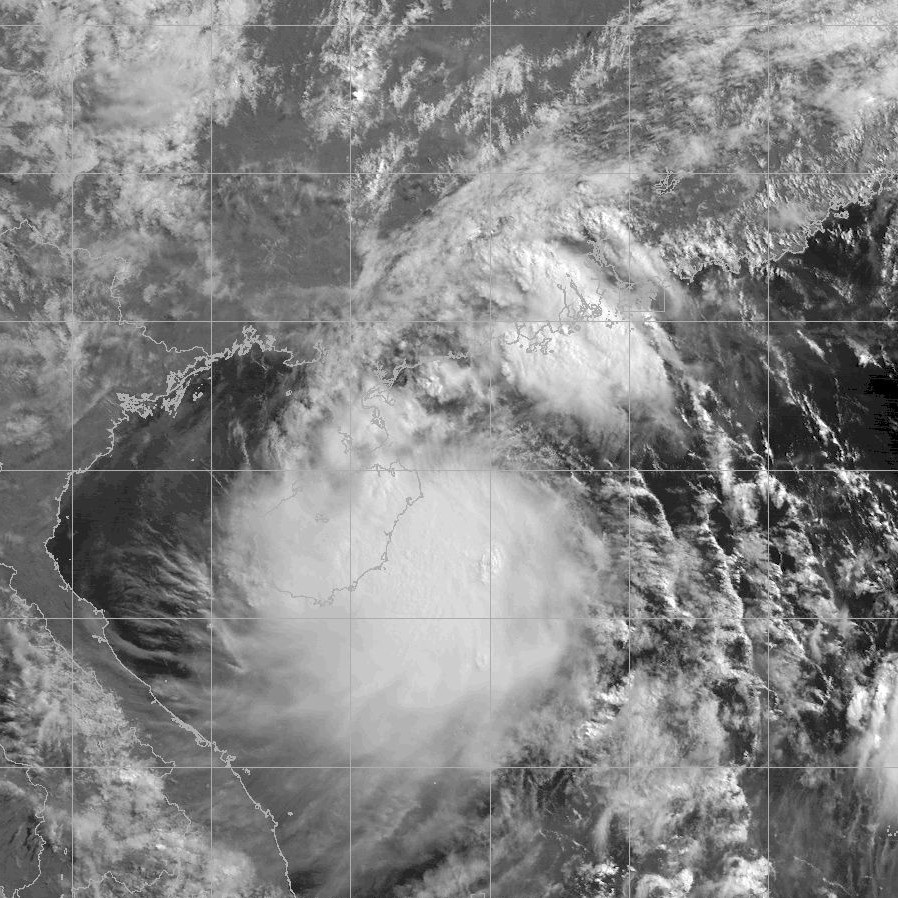
Tropical Storm Jelawat/Domeng

Wettest tropical cyclones and their remnants in Malaysia Highest-known totals
Precipitation			Storm	Location	Ref.
Rank	mm	in	Storm	Location	Ref.
1	220	8.66	Jelawat/Domeng 2006	Kampung Bundu	

== Mauritius ==
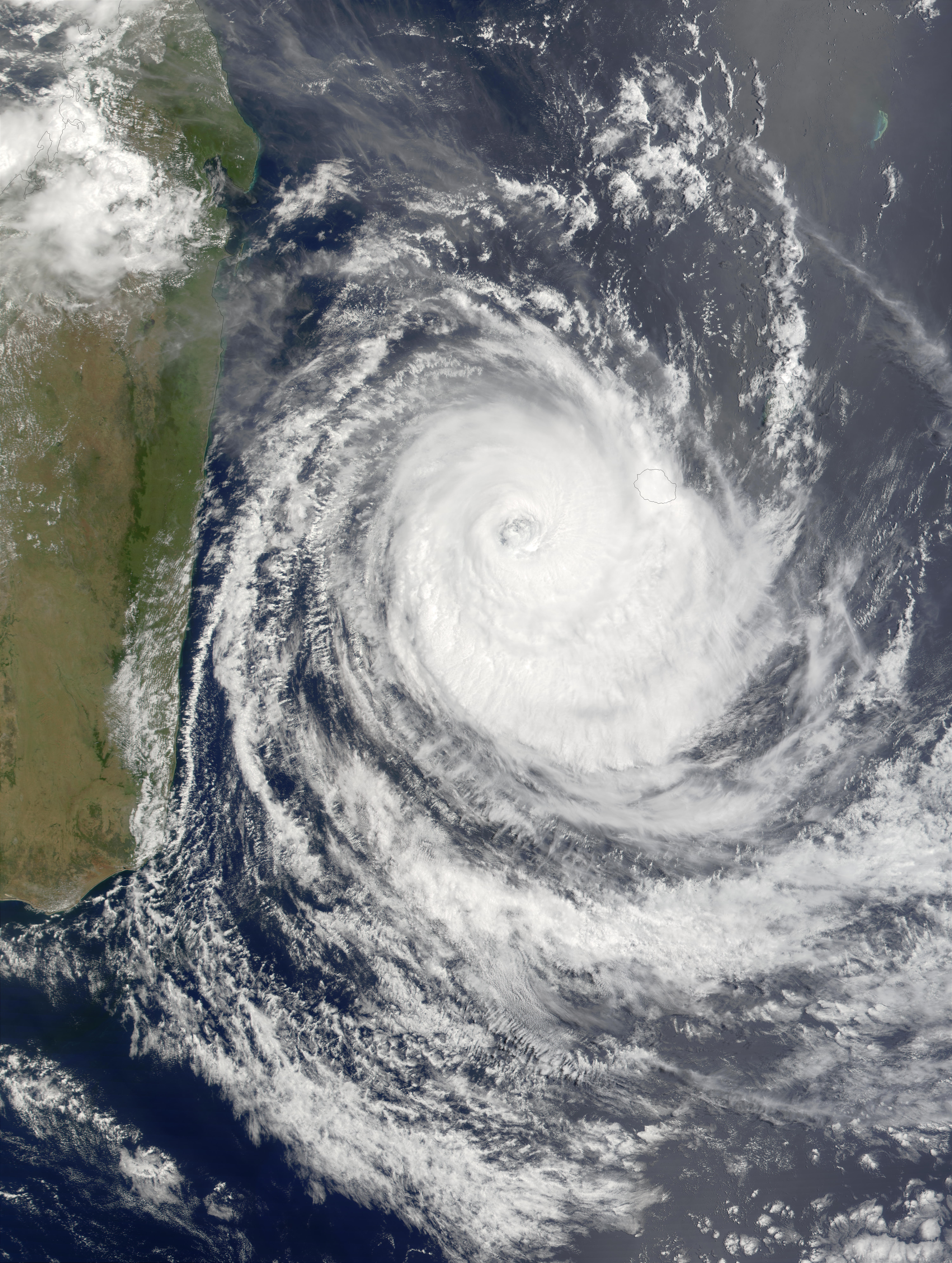
Cyclone Dina (2002)

Wettest tropical cyclones and their remnants in Mauritius Highest-known totals
Precipitation			Storm	Location	Ref.
Rank	mm	in	Storm	Location	Ref.
1	745.2	29.34	Dina 2002	Pierrefonds	
2	711	27.99	Hollanda 1994	Mare-aux-Vacoas	
3	227	8.937	Davina 1999	Arnaud	
3	202.8	7.98	Hennie 2005	Sans-Souci	
4	192.8	7.59	Dumile 2013	Arnaud	
5	58.8	2.31	Crystal 2002	Providence	

== Marshall Islands ==
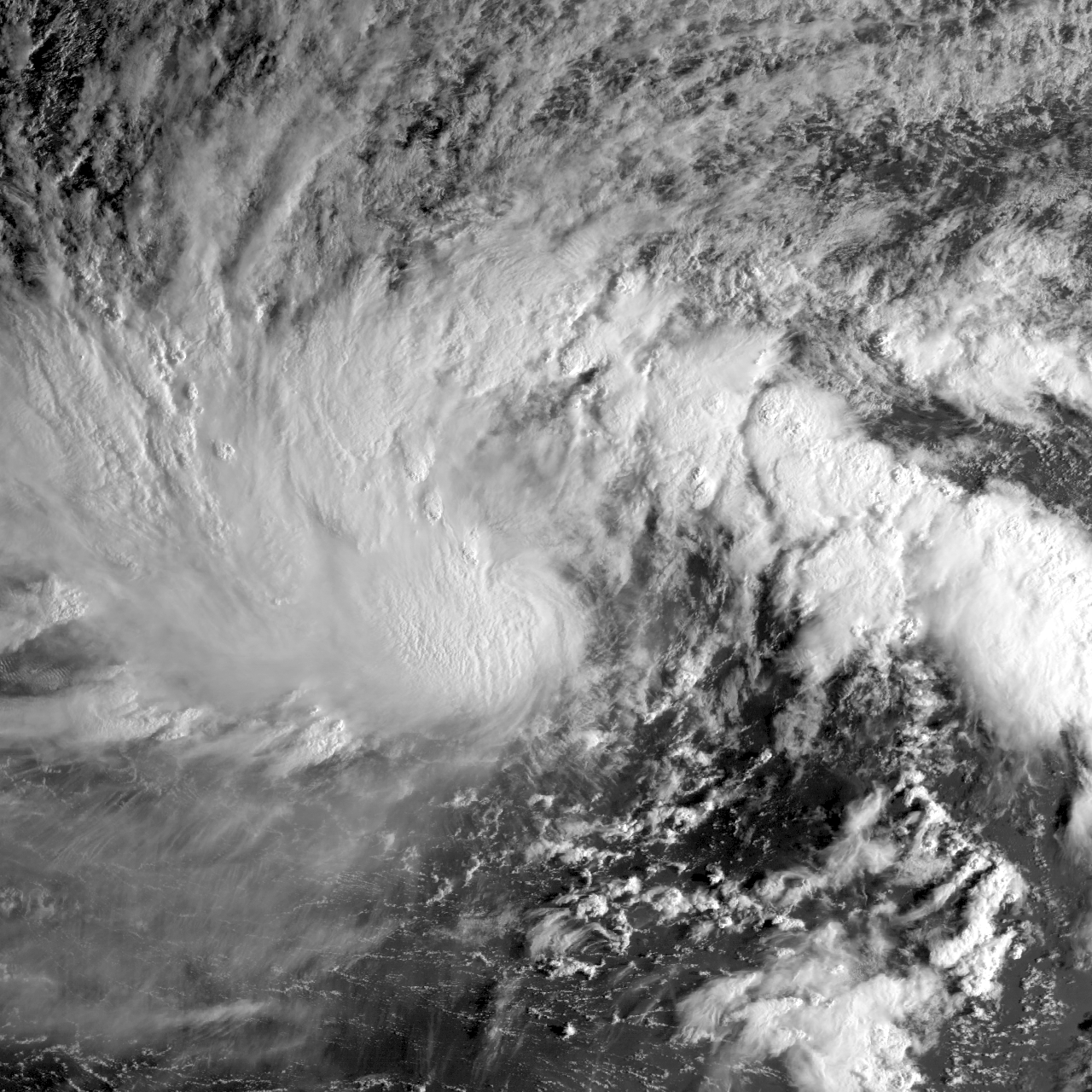
Tropical Storm Bavi

Wettest tropical cyclones and their remnants in the Marshall Islands Highest-known totals
Precipitation			Storm	Location	Ref.
Rank	mm	in	Storm	Location	Ref.
1	271	10.65	Bavi 2015	Kwajalein Atoll	

== Mexico ==
Hurricane Wilma of 2005 drifted over the northeast portion of the Yucatán peninsula for a couple of days, dropping significant rains. A report of 1,576 millimetres (62.0 in) was reported by the Servicio Meteorológico Nacional in Mexico, which is the wettest known 24-hour rainfall amount ever measured in Mexico. Second on the list is from Hurricane John in 2024, which accumulated up to 1,442 millimetres (56.8 in) of rain at Acapulco in Guerrero. Below is a list of the highest known storm total rainfall amounts from individual tropical cyclones across Mexico. Most of the rainfall information was provided by the Mexico's National Weather Service, Servicio Meteorológico Nacional, which is a part of the National Water Commission, Comisión Nacional del Agua.

Hurricane Wilma

Wettest tropical cyclones and their remnants Mexico (Overall) Highest-known totals
Precipitation			Storm	Location	Ref.
Rank	mm	in	Storm	Location	Ref.
1	1576	62.05	Wilma 2005	Quintana Roo	
2	1442	56.8	John 2024	Acapulco	
3	1119	44.06	Frances 1998	Escuintla	
4	1107	43.6	Manuel 2013	Acapulco	
5	1098	43.23	TD 11 (1999)	Jalacingo	
6	1011	39.80	Juliette 2001	Cuadano/Santiago	
7	950	37.41	Dolly 1996	Igualapa	
8	941	37.06	Fifi 1974	Tlanchinol	
9	890	35.04	Alex 2010	Monterrey	
10	829	32.62	Pauline 1997	Puente Jula	

== Federated States of Micronesia ==
=== Chuuk ===
Elevations of the islands surrounding Chuuk lagoon reach a height of about 1,450 feet (440 m). Typhoon Chataan led to excessive rainfall on this island from June 23 – July 3, 2002, when a total of 939 mm (37.0 in) fell. During the time frame when Chataan was declared a tropical cyclone from July 1–3, 622 mm (24.5 in) fell, with 506 mm (19.9 in) falling on the 2nd alone at the international airport.

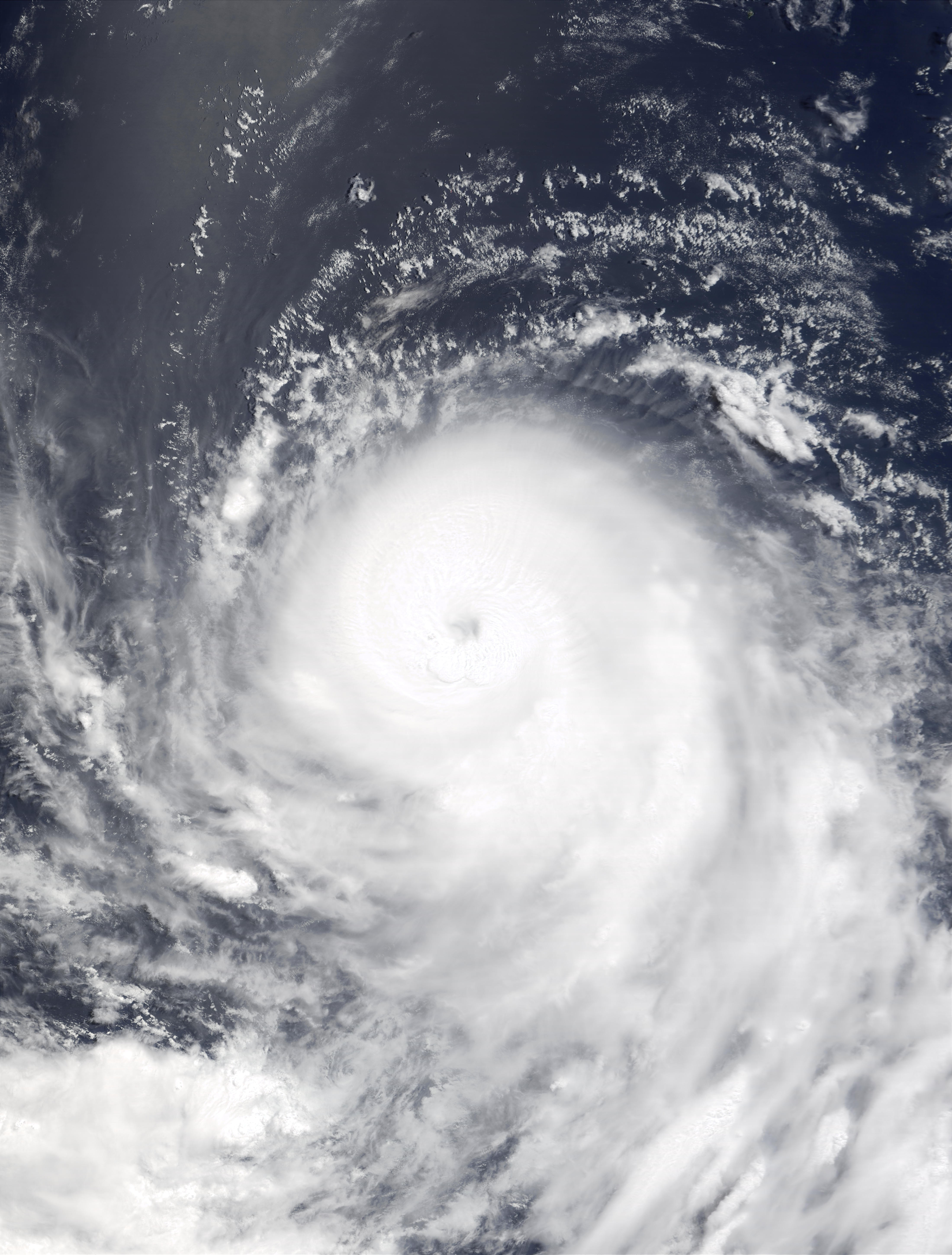
Typhoon Chataan

Wettest tropical cyclones and their remnants on Chuuk Highest-known totals
Precipitation			Storm	Location	Ref.
Rank	mm	in	Storm	Location	Ref.
1	939.0	36.96	Chataan 2002	Chuuk Int'l Airport	
2	447.0	17.60	Dale 1996	Chuuk WSO AP	
3	427.5	16.83	Sudal 2004	Chuuk WSO AP	
4	405.1	15.95	Andy 1989	Truk WSO Airport	
5	381.1	15.03	Jean 1968	Truk WSO Airport	
6	371.9	14.64	Karen 1962	Truk WSO Airport	
7	370.6	14.59	Pamela 1976	Truk WSO Airport	
8	344.7	13.57	Harriet 1959	Truk WSO Airport	
9	234.2	9.22	Kulap 2005	Chuuk WSO AP	
10	214.1	8.43	Pongsona 2002	Chuuk WSO AP	

=== Kosrae ===
Wettest tropical cyclones and their remnants in Kosrae State Highest-known totals
Precipitation			Storm	Location	Ref.
Rank	mm	in	Storm	Location	Ref.
1	509.3	20.05	Faxai 2001	Kosrae	
2	434.1	17.09	Phanfone 2002	Kosrae	

=== Pohnpei State ===
The state is mountainous island lies in the tropical northwest Pacific Ocean.

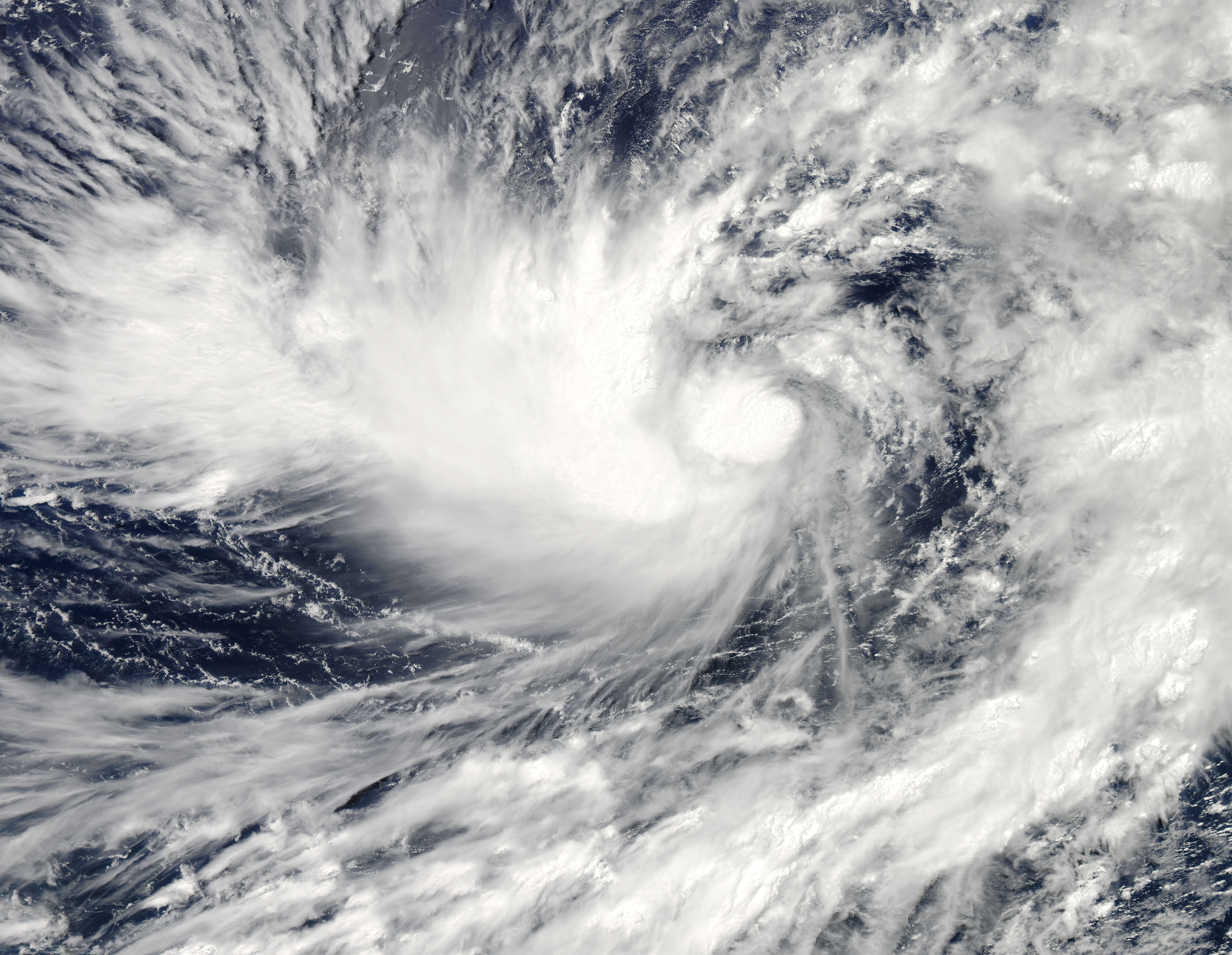
Tropical Storm Dolphin intensifying on May 10, 2015

Wettest tropical cyclones and their remnants in Pohnpei State Highest-known totals
Precipitation			Storm	Location	Ref.
Rank	mm	in	Storm	Location	Ref.
1	603	23.74	Dolphin 2015	Pohnpei	
2	247	9.72	Axel 1992		
3	118	4.65	Haishen 2015	Pohnpei	

=== Yap State ===
The wettest known tropical cyclone for the state was Ruby in 1982, which drifted in the island's vicinity for several days during its initial development phase.

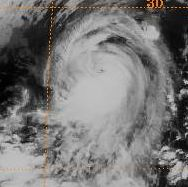
Typhoon Ruby (1982)

Wettest tropical cyclones and their remnants in Yap state Highest-known totals
Precipitation			Storm	Location	Ref.
Rank	mm	in	Storm	Location	Ref.
1	594.4	23.40	Ruby 1982	Yap Island WSO Airport	
2	390.9	15.39	Imbudo 2003	Yap Island WSO Airport	
3	318.5	12.54	Winnie 1969	Yap Island WSO Airport	
4	313.9	12.36	Fern 1996	Yap Island WSO Airport	
5	301.8	11.88	Wilda 1967	Yap Island WSO Airport	
6	289.1	11.38	Ophelia 1958	Yap Island WSO Airport	
7	288.5	11.36	Hope 1985	Yap Island WSO Airport	
8	250.2	9.85	Georgia 1962	Yap Island WSO Airport	
9	236.5	9.31	Fran 1976	Yap Island WSO Airport	
10	231.9	9.13	Faye 1963	Yap Island WSO Airport	

== Mozambique ==
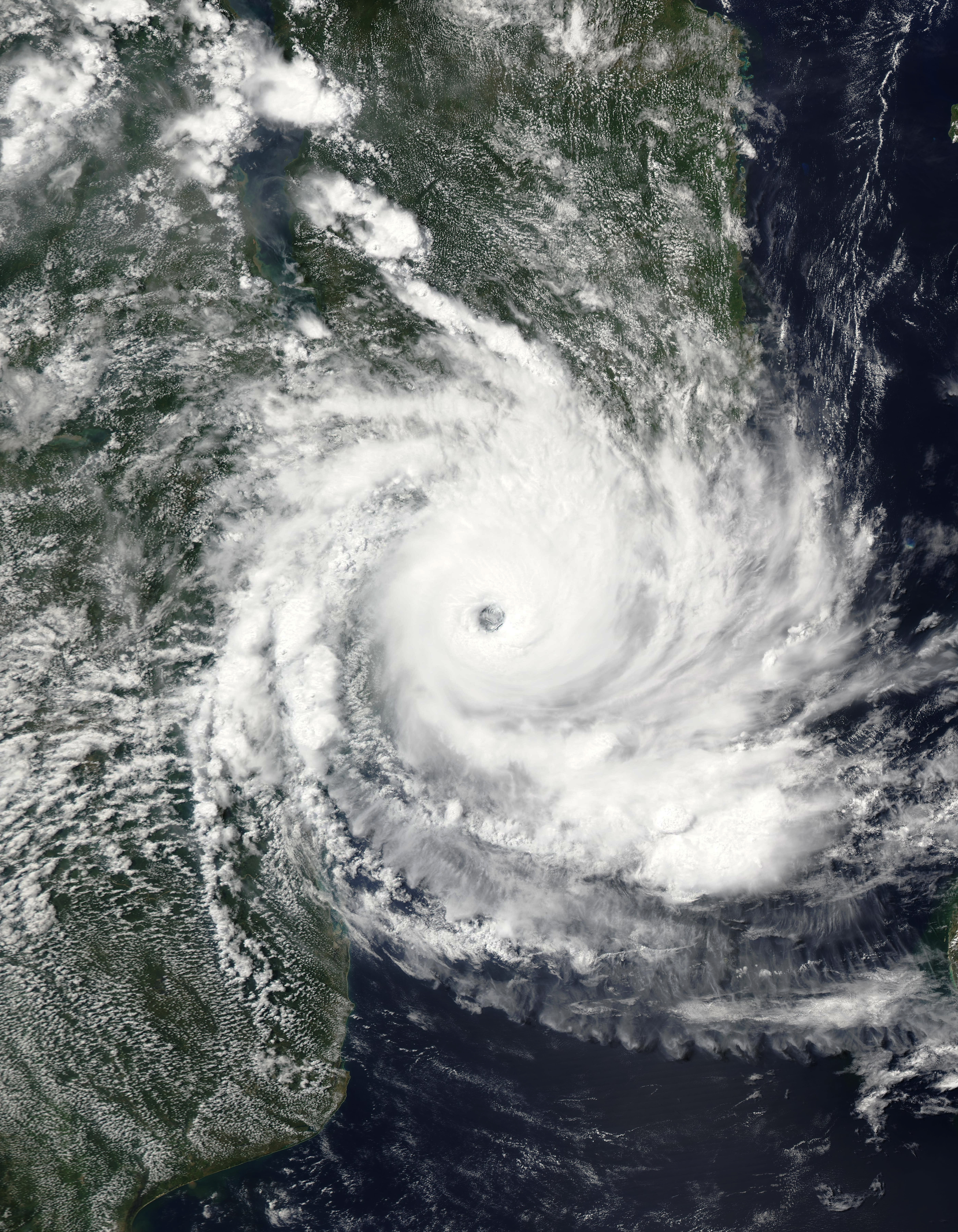
Cyclone Freddy

The elevation of the country increases to the west, with mountains on its highest plateau reaching nearly 8,000 feet (2,400 m).

Wettest tropical cyclones and their remnants in Mozambique Highest-known totals
Precipitation			Storm	Location	Ref.
Rank	mm	in	Storm	Location	Ref.
1	672	26.46	Freddy 2023	Marromeu	
2	600	24	Idai 2019	Chimoio	
3	502	19.76	Eline 2000	Levubu	
4	281	11.06	Delfina 2003		
5	200	7.87	Jokwe 2008	Nampula	
6	190	7.50	Japhet 2003		

== Myanmar ==
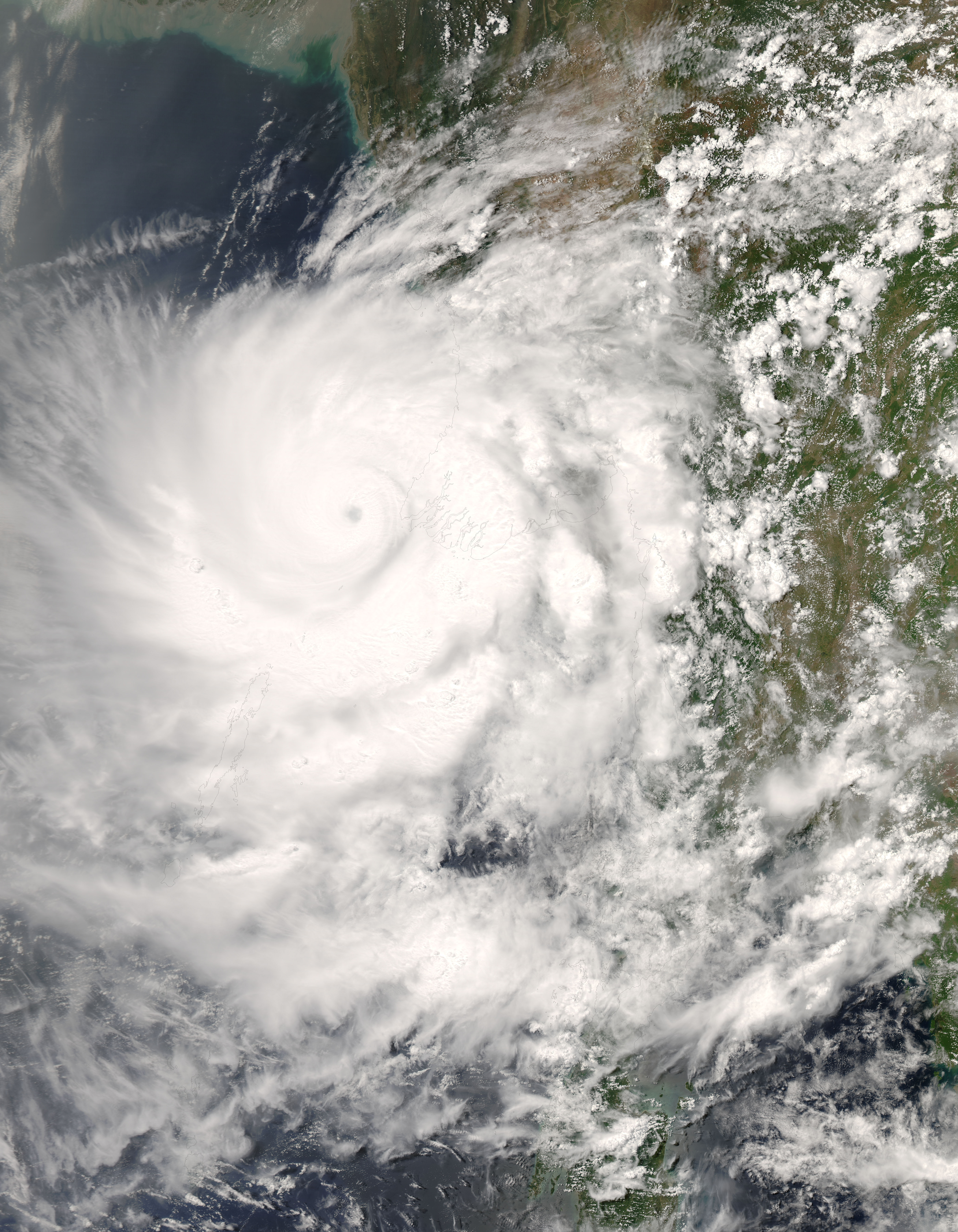
Cyclone Nargis near landfall

Wettest tropical cyclones and their remnants in Myanmar Highest-known totals
Precipitation			Storm	Location	Ref.
Rank	mm	in	Storm	Location	Ref.
1	600	23.62	Nargis 2008		
2	343.9	13.54	T.D. No. 2 2007		
3	300	11.81	Komen 2015		

== Nepal ==
Some of the highest elevations on the planet lie in Nepal. Eight out of fourteen highest peaks in the world lie in the Nepalese Himalaya including the highest peak of the World, Mt. Everest (8848 m). During a tropical depression that affected the Indian Subcontinent in 2004, 51.3 millimetres (2.02 in) of rain fell at Kathmandu airport in the 24‑hour period ending at 1200 UTC on October 7.

== Netherlands Antilles ==
=== Saba ===
Wettest tropical cyclones and their remnants on Saba Highest-known totals
Precipitation			Storm	Location	Ref.
Rank	mm	in	Storm	Location	Ref.
1	286.3 mm	11.27 inches	Alice (1954)		

=== St. Eustatius ===
Wettest tropical cyclones and their remnants on St. Eustatius Highest-known totals
Precipitation			Storm	Location	Ref.
Rank	mm	in	Storm	Location	Ref.
1	203.2 mm	8.00 inches	Alice (1954)		

=== Sint Maarten ===
This hilly island is partially owned by France and partially claimed by the Netherlands.

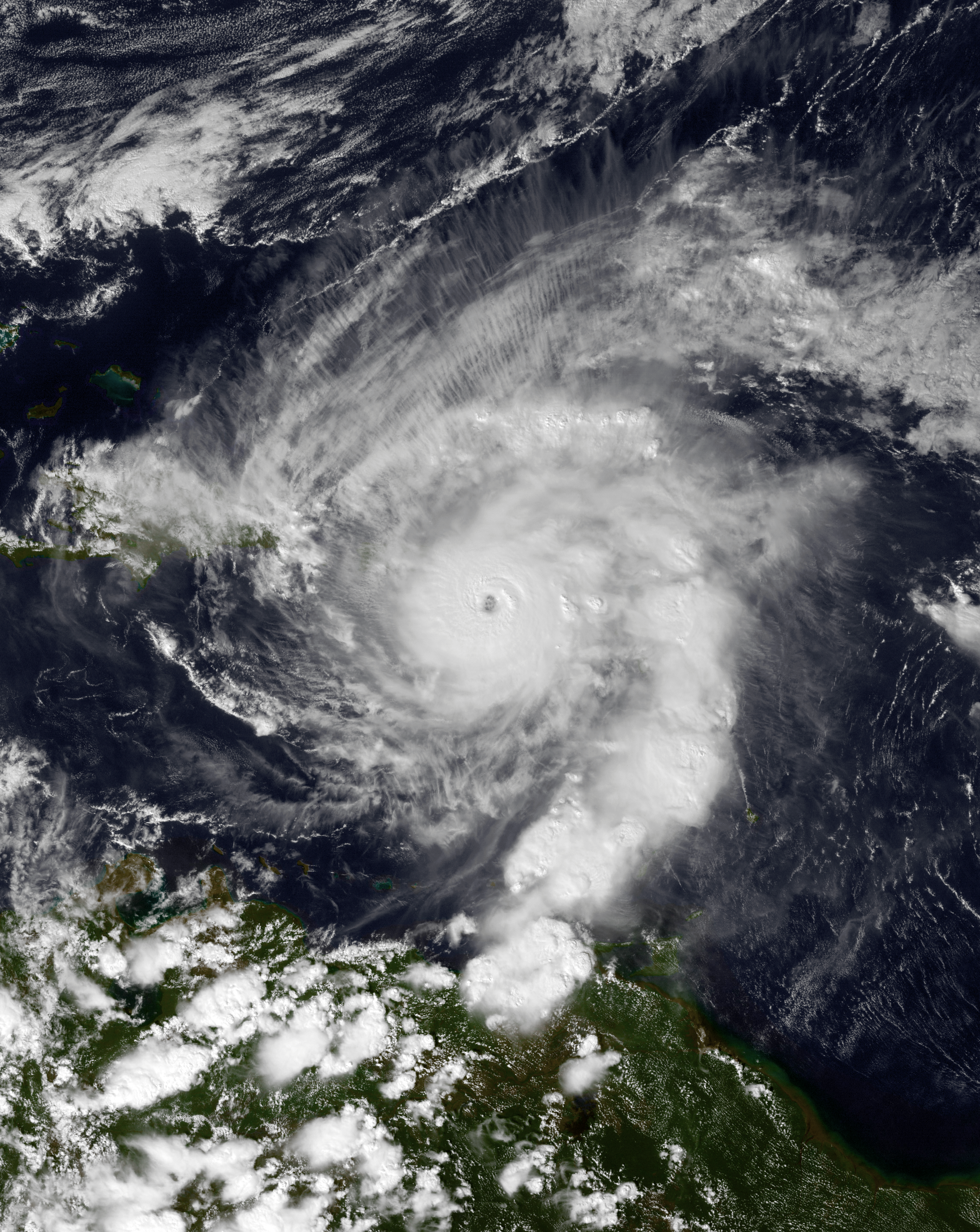
Hurricane Lenny

Wettest tropical cyclones and their remnants on Saint Martin/Sint Maarten Highest-known totals
Precipitation			Storm	Location	Ref.
Rank	mm	in	Storm	Location	Ref.
1	700.0	27.56	Lenny 1999	Meteorological Office, Phillpsburg	
2	280.2	11.03	Jose 1999	Princess Juliana International Airport	
3	165.1	6.50	Luis 1995		
4	111.7	4.40	Otto 2010	Princess Juliana International Airport	
5	92.3	3.63	Rafael 2012	Princess Juliana International Airport	
6	51.0	2.01	Laura 2020	Princess Juliana International Airport	
7	42.6	1.68	Isaias 2020	Princess Juliana International Airport	
8	7.9	0.31	Ernesto 2012	Princess Juliana International Airport	
9	7.0	0.28	Chantal 2013	Princess Juliana International Airport	
10	6.6	0.26	Dorian 2013	Princess Juliana International Airport	

== New Zealand ==
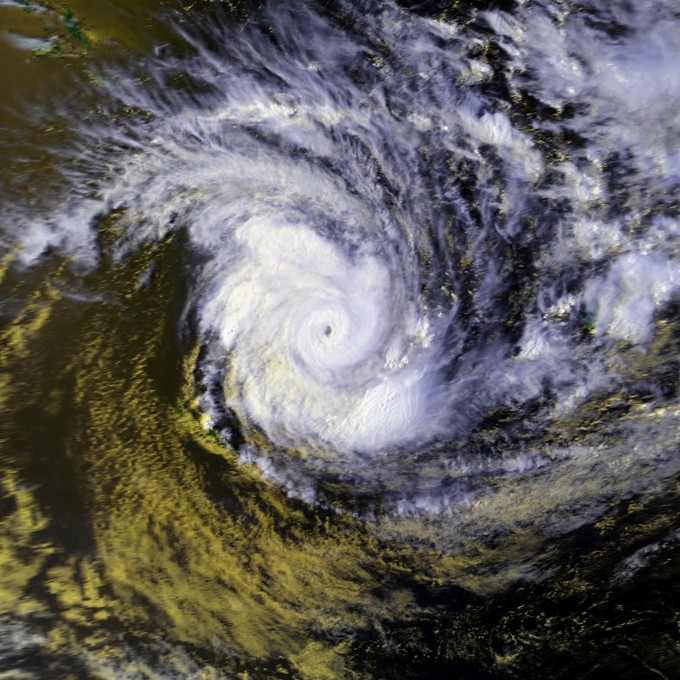
Cyclone Bola (1988)

Most tropical cyclones which pass near New Zealand are in extratropical transition (ET) or have become extratropical, which can enhance their heavy rainfall threat.

Wettest tropical cyclones and their remnants in New Zealand Highest-known totals
Precipitation			Storm	Location	Ref.
Rank	mm	in	Storm	Location	Ref.
1	970	38.19	Hilda 1990	North Egmont Visitor Centre	
2	917	36.10	Bola 1988	Glenross station	
3	762	30.00	Rewa 1994	Collier Creek	
4	488	19.21	Gabrielle 2023	Hikuwai River	
5	425	16.73	Fergus 1996	The Pinnacles	
6	415	16.34	Delilah 1989	Puhipuhi	
7	321	12.64	Dinah 1967	Mangahoe	
8	311	12.24	Beti 1996	The Pinnacles	
9	306	12.05	Giselle 1968	Leatham	
10	290	11.42	Ivy 2004	The Pinnacles	

== Nicaragua ==
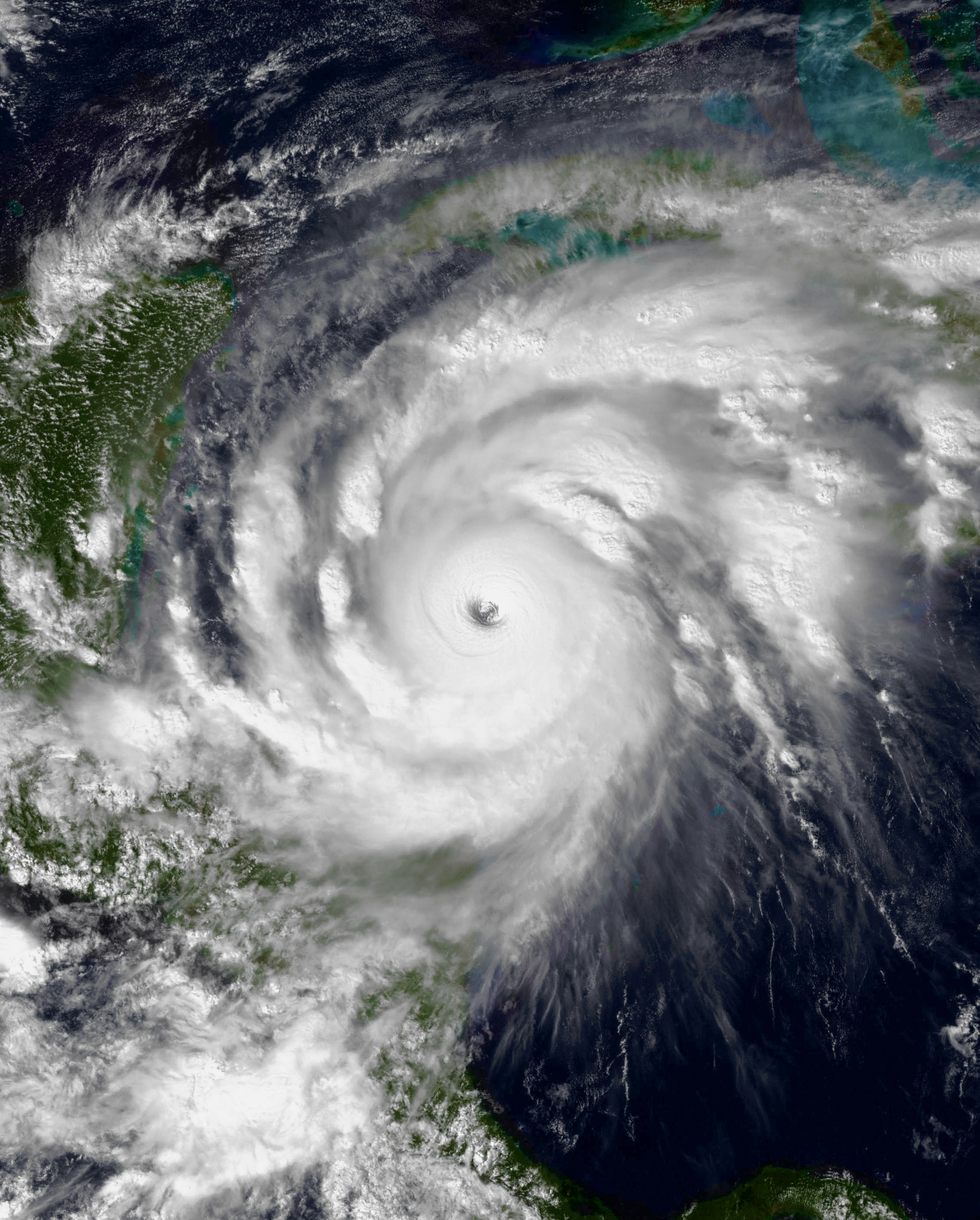
Hurricane Mitch

Wettest tropical cyclones and their remnants in Nicaragua Highest-known totals
Precipitation			Storm	Location	Ref.
Rank	mm	in	Storm	Location	Ref.
1	1597	62.87	Mitch 1998	Picacho/Chinandega	
2	674	26.55	Eta 2020	Puerto Corinto	
3	500	19.69	Joan 1988		
4	447	17.60	Gert 1993	Chinandega	
5	368	14.49	Fifi 1974	Chinandega	
6	298	11.72	Alma 2008	Punto Sandino	
7	272	10.70	Cesar 1996	Bluefields	
8	231	9.10	Ida 2009	Puerto Cabezas	
9	181	7.11	Felix 2007	Puerto Cabezas	

== Niue ==
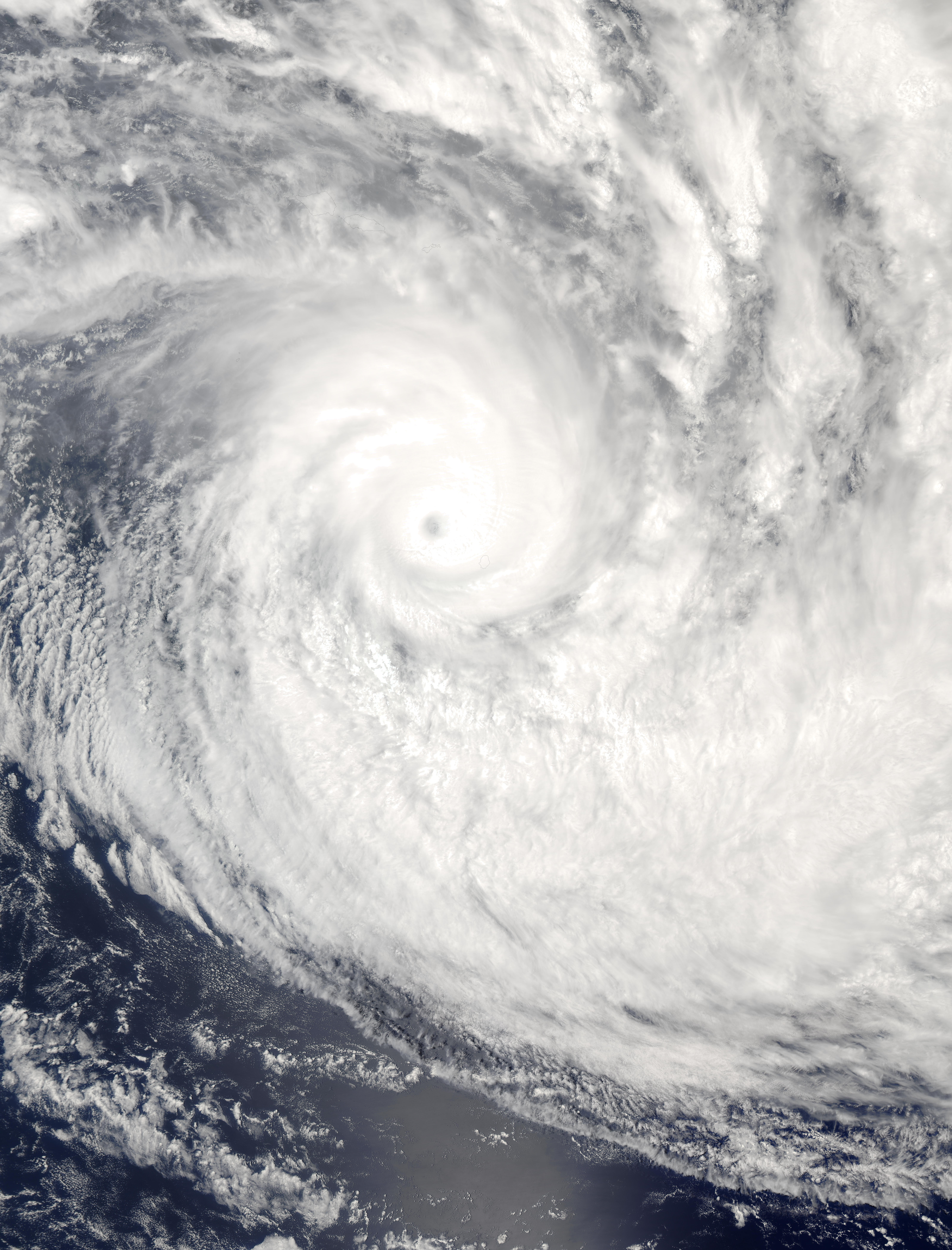
Cyclone Heta

During the passage of Tropical Cyclone Heta in January 2004, the Niue Meteorological Station reported a record 24-hour rainfall of 999.2 millimetres (39.34 in).

Wettest tropical cyclones and their remnants on Niue Highest-known totals
Precipitation			Storm	Location	Ref.
Rank	mm	in	Storm	Location	Ref.
1	999.2 mm	39.34 in	Heta 2004	Niue Meteorological Station	
2	107.5 mm	4.23 in	01F 2014-15		
3	101.8 mm	4.01 in	Winston 2016		
4	77.6 mm	3.06 in	Tino 2015		
5	66.2 mm	2.61 in	Keli 1997		
6	28.4 mm	1.12 in	Ula 2015		
7	23.9 mm	0.94 in	Victor 2016		
8	21.1 mm	0.83 in	Ron 1998		

== Oman ==
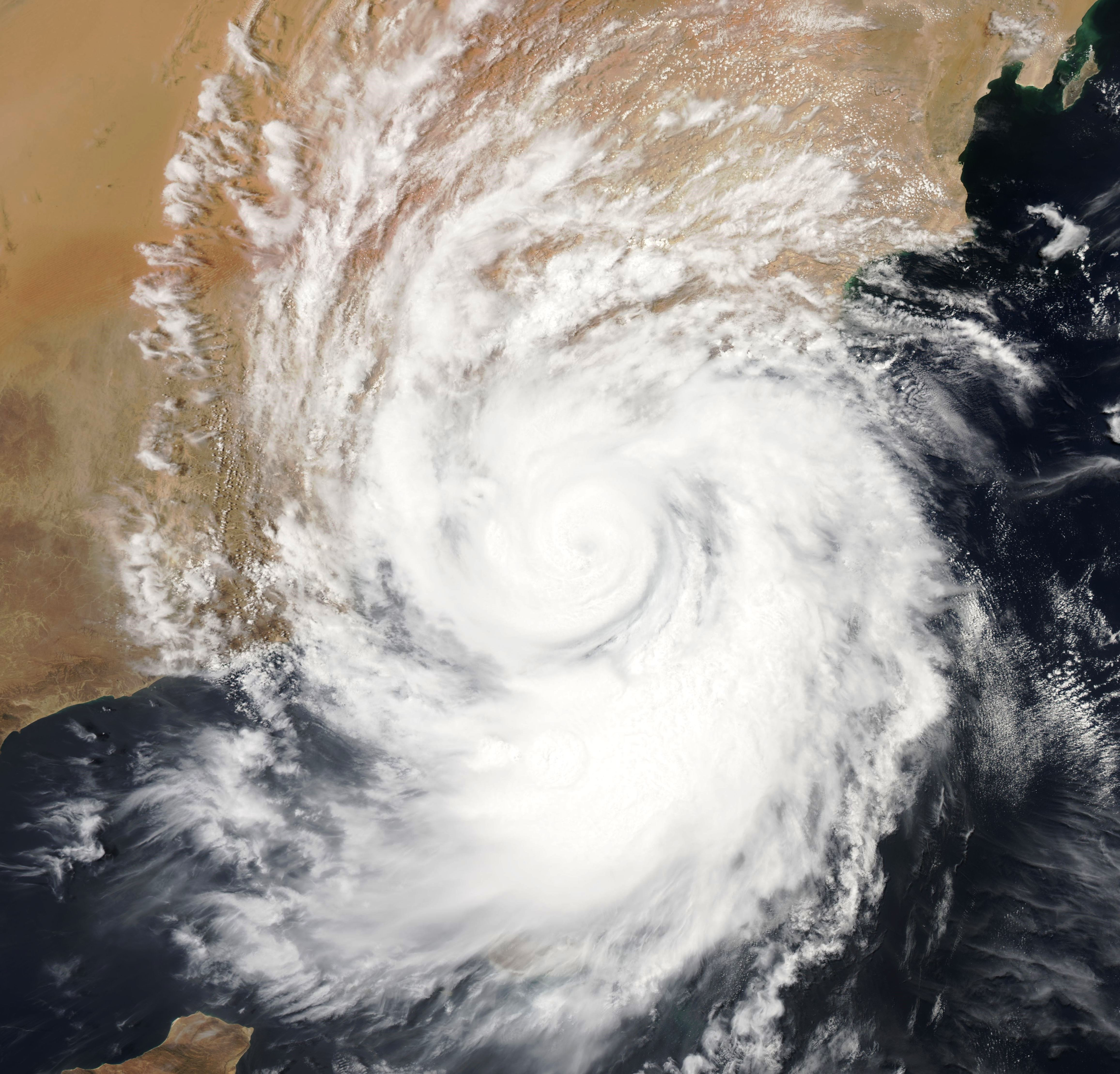
Cyclone Mekunu

Wettest tropical cyclones and their remnants in Oman Highest-known totals
Precipitation			Storm	Location	Ref.
Rank	mm	in	Storm	Location	Ref.
1	617.0	24.29	Mekunu 2018	Salalah	
2	610.0	24.02	Gonu 2007		
3	488.0	19.21	Phet 2010	JabalHilm	
4	482.4	18.99	Masirah Cyclone 1977	Salalah	
5	300.2	11.82	T.S. 02A (1996)	Dhofar	
6	285.5	11.24	Muscat Cyclone 1890	Muscat	
7	251.0	9.88	Oman Cyclone 2002	Qairoon	
8	250.0	9.84	Ashobaa 2015	Masirah Island	
9	230.0	9.06	Salalah Cyclone 1963	Salalah	
10	82.0	3.23	Salalah Cyclone 1959	Salalah	

== Pakistan ==
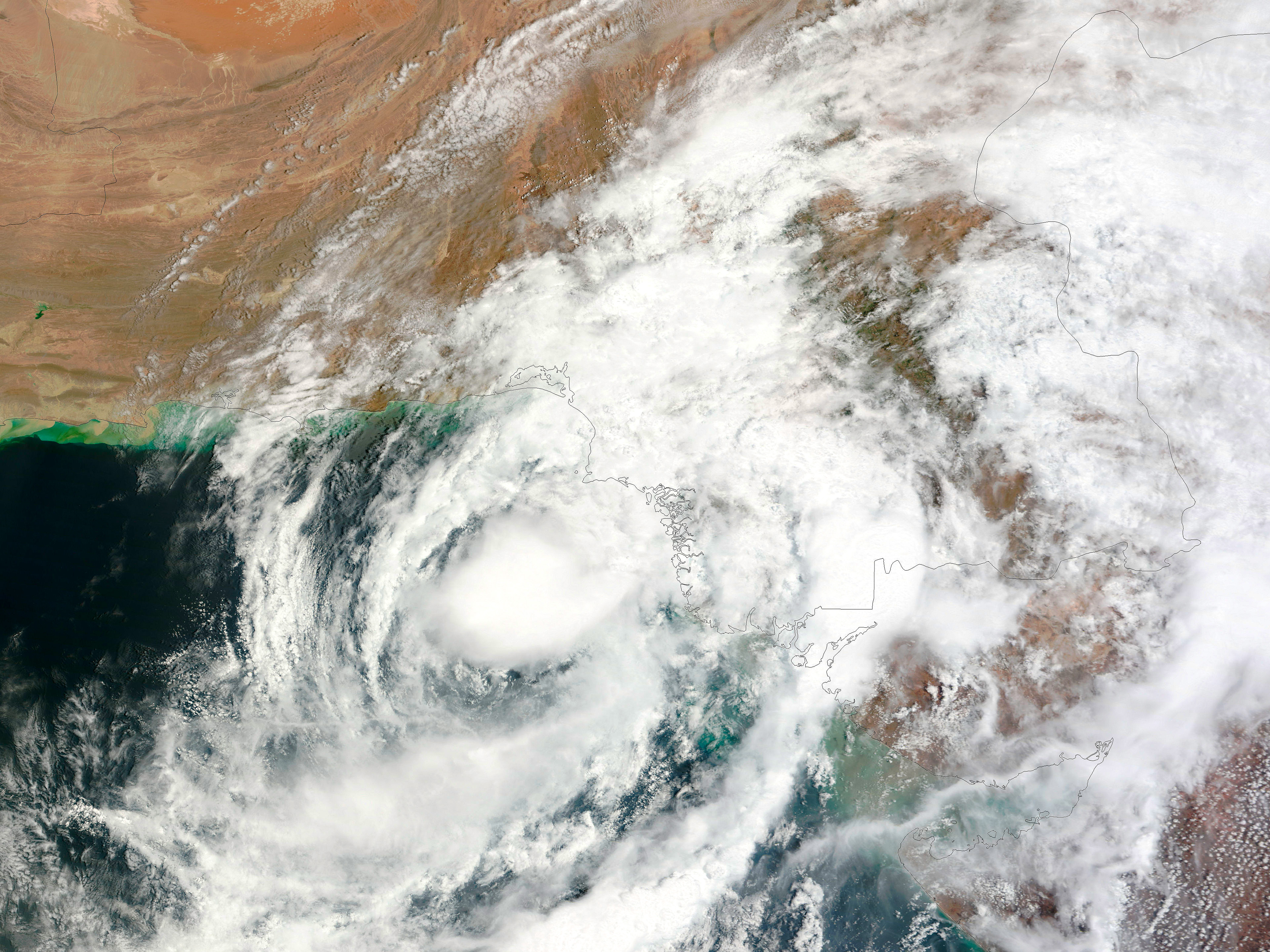
Cyclone Phet, a cyclone making landfall in Pakistan in June 2010 as a deep depression

Tropical cyclones for the Arabian Sea usually affect Pakistan. Tropical cyclones from the Bay of Bengal can affect Pakistan, though they usually weaken by the time they reach the Pakistani coastline.

Wettest tropical cyclones and their remnants in Pakistan Highest-known totals
Precipitation			Storm	Location	Ref.
Rank	mm	in	Storm	Location	Ref.
1	370	14.57	Phet (2010)	Gwadar	
2	285	11.22	Cyclone (1999)	Keti Bandar	
3	245	9.64	BOB 03 (2009)	Karachi	
4	191	7.51	BOB 06 (2007)	Karachi	
5	145	5.71	Onil (2004)	Thatta	
6	110	3.94	Yemyin (2007)	Karachi	
7	43	1.69	BOB 04 (2007)	Karachi	
8	18	0.70	BOB 03 (2009)	Karachi	

== Palau ==
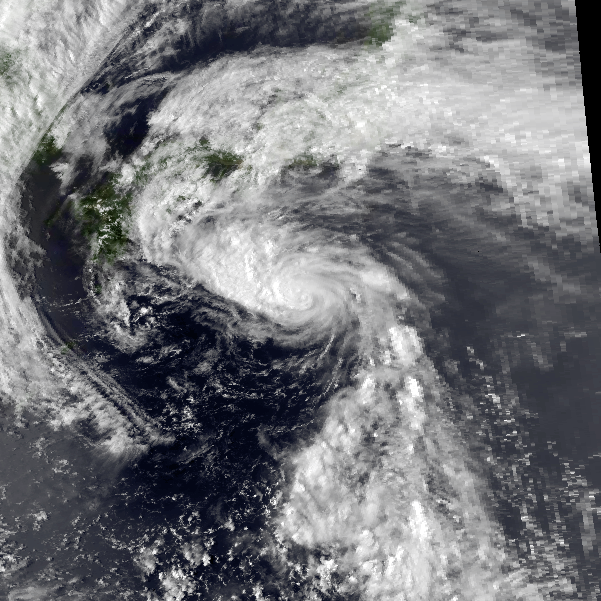
Severe Tropical Storm Nathan

Palau consists of a string of islands that is rugged and surrounds a lagoon. Elevations up to 2,060 feet (630 m) exist within the island group.

Wettest tropical cyclones and their remnants in Palau Highest-known totals
Precipitation			Storm	Location	Ref.
Rank	mm	in	Storm	Location	Ref.
1	470.9	18.54	Marie 1976	Koror	
2	293.1	11.54	Nathan 1993	Nekken Forestry	
3	281.4	11.08	Ruby 1982	Koror	
4	248.9	9.799	Mike 1990	Koror	
5	121.7	4.79	Dianmu 2004	Koror	
6	84.3	3.32	Bopha 2012	Koror	
7	47.8	1.88	Ewiniar 2006	Koror	

== Panama ==
Inflow to the south of Hurricane Mitch brought impressive rainfalls to Panama. Veladero de Tole recorded 695 millimetres (27.4 in) of rainfall between October 22 and 31, 1998.

== Philippines ==
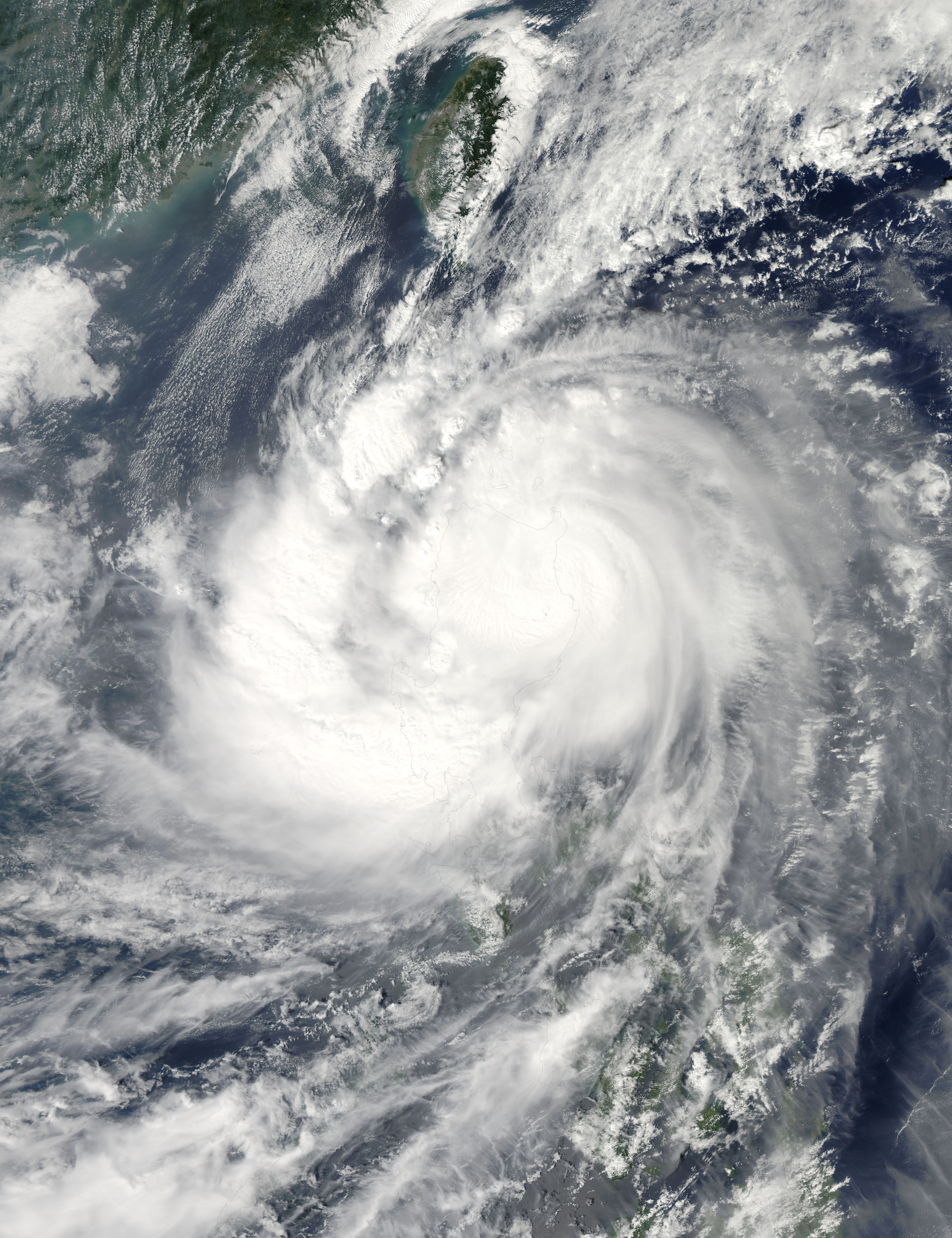
Typhoon Parma/Pepeng

The Philippines is fairly mountainous, with the highest terrain found in Luzon.

Wettest tropical cyclones and their remnants in the Philippine islands Highest-known totals
Precipitation			Storm	Location	Ref.
Rank	mm	in	Storm	Location	Ref.
1	2210.0	87.01	July 1911 cyclone	Baguio	
2	1854.3	73.00	Pepeng (Parma) (2009)	Baguio	
3	1216.0	47.86	Trining (Carla) (1967)	Baguio	
4	1116.0	43.94	Iliang (Zeb) (1998)	La Trinidad, Benguet	
5	1085.8	42.74	Feria (Utor) (2001)	Baguio	
6	1077.8	42.43	Lando (Koppu) (2015)	Baguio	
7	1012.7	39.87	Igme (Mindulle) (2004)		
8	902.0	35.51	Dante (Kujira) (2009)		
9	879.9	34.64	September 1929 typhoon	Virac, Catanduanes	
10	869.6	34.24	Openg (Dinah) (1977)	Western Luzon	

== Samoa ==
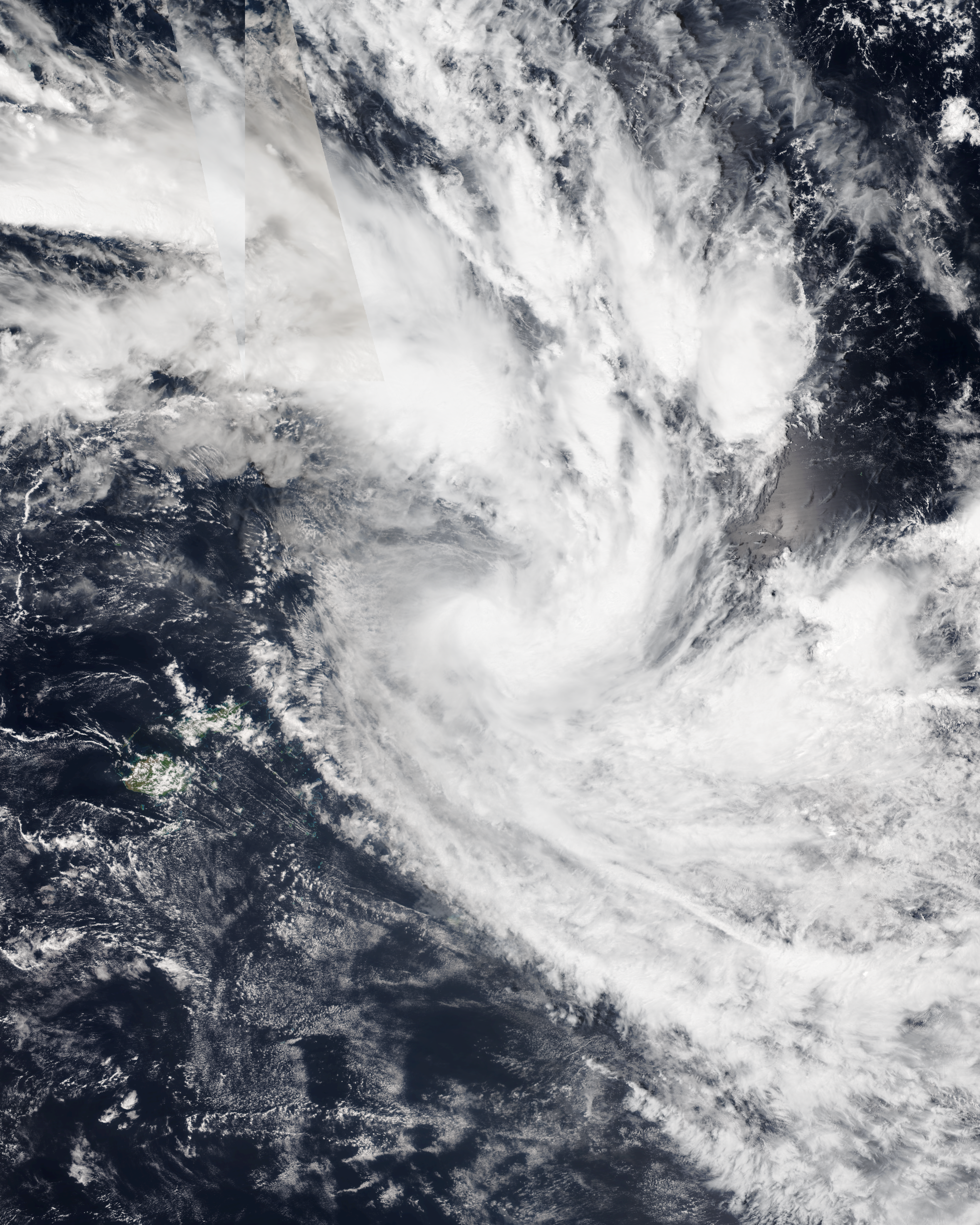
Cyclone Tuni

Wettest tropical cyclones and their remnants in Samoa Highest-known totals
Precipitation			Storm	Location	Ref.
Rank	mm	in	Storm	Location	Ref.
1	508.2	20.01	Tuni, 2015	Afimalu	
2	470.5	18.52	Ula, 2016	Afimalu	
3	404.0	15.91	Evan, 2012	Alaoa, Upolu	
4	382.4	15.06	Amos, 2016	Afimalu	
5	320.0	12.60	Gita, 2018	Le-Pue	
6	190.0	7.48	01F 2014	Salani	
7	171.8	6.76	05F 2014	Salani	
8	170.6	6.72	08F, 2015	Letui	
9	169.5	6.67	19F, 2017	Lepiu	
10	138.4	5.45	09F, 2017	Afimalu	

== Singapore ==
Typhoon Vamei of December 20, 2001 was the only known storm to ever hit the island state. It dropped 165.1 millimetres (6.50 in) of rainfall.

== Solomon Islands ==
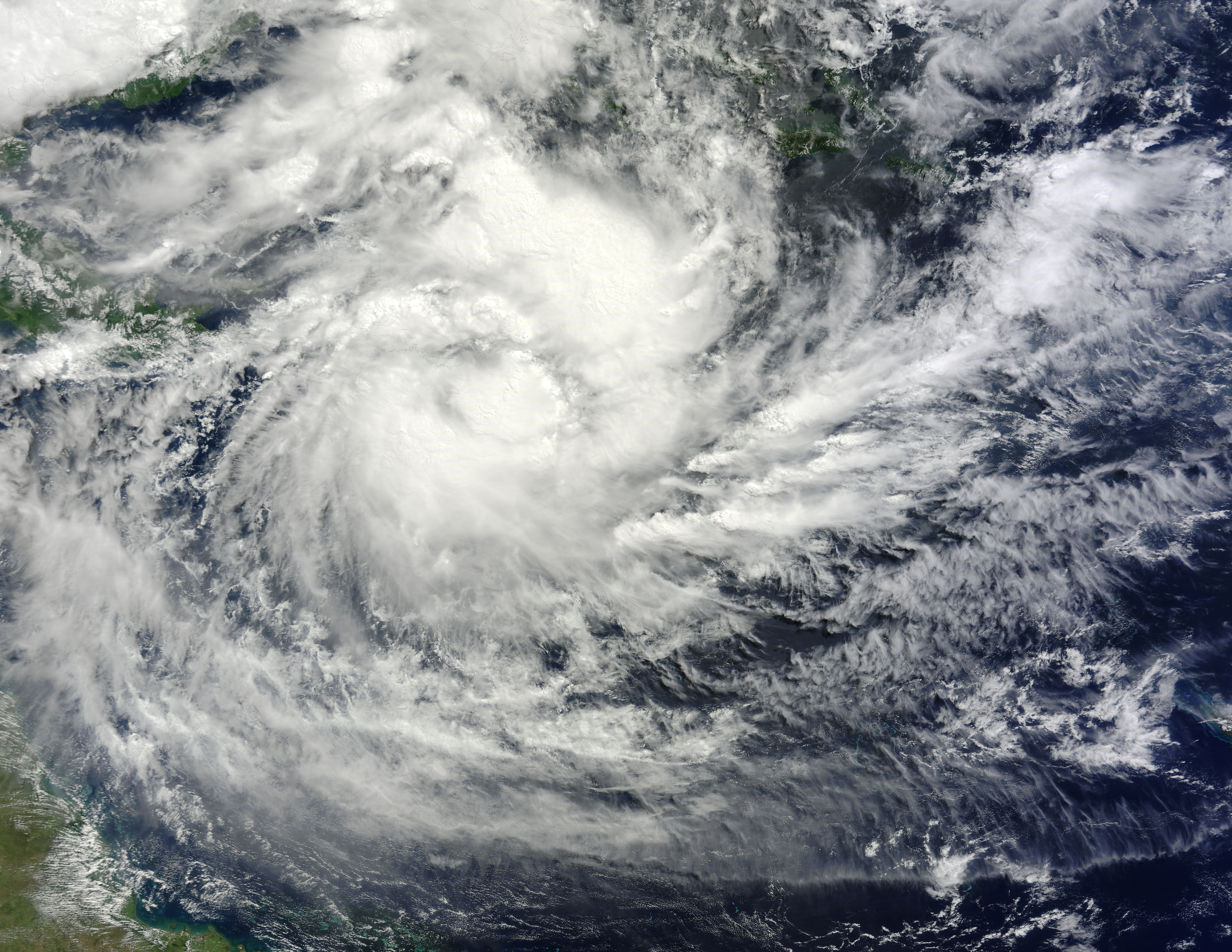
Cyclone Ita

Wettest tropical cyclones and their remnants in the Solomon Islands Highest-known totals
Precipitation			Storm	Location	Ref.
Rank	mm	in	Storm	Location	Ref.
1	>2100	>82.68	Namu 1986	Mount Popomanaseu, Guadalcanal	
2	>1000	>39.37	Ita 2014	Gold Ridge mine	
3	495	19.49	Pam 2015	Lata, Santa Cruz Island	
4	305	12.01	Angela 1966	Guadalcanal	
5	282	11.10	Raquel 2015	Munda, Western Province	

== South Africa ==
Tropical Cyclone Eline in February 2000 dropped significant rains on portions of South Africa. The highest amount noted was 480 mm (19 in) at Thohoyandou.

== Spain ==
Wettest tropical cyclones and their remnants in Spain Highest-known totals
Precipitation			Storm	Location	Ref.
Rank	mm	in	Storm	Location	Ref.
1	85	3.35	Vince	Córdoba, Spain	

== Sri Lanka ==
A tropical depression in early October 2004 led to heavy rains across Sri Lanka. The maximum was measured at Galle where 117.2 mm (4.61 in) fell in the 24‑hour period ending at 0600 UTC on the 2nd.

== St. Brandon, South Indian Ocean ==
Tropical Cyclone Darius of New Year's Eve/Day of 2003/2004 passed about 45 miles (72 km) west-northwest of the island. Rainfall over the 24‑hour period of closest approach was 135 mm (5.3 in).

== St. Kitts and Nevis ==
Wettest tropical cyclones and their remnants in Saint Kitts and Nevis Highest-known totals
Precipitation			Storm	Location	Ref.
Rank	mm	in	Storm	Location	Ref.
1	153.7	6.05	Alice (1954)		

== Taiwan ==
The mountainous island of Taiwan experiences an average of 1.8 tropical cyclone landfalls each year. Due to its rugged topography, Taiwan sees extreme rains from tropical cyclones, particularly in its central mountain range.

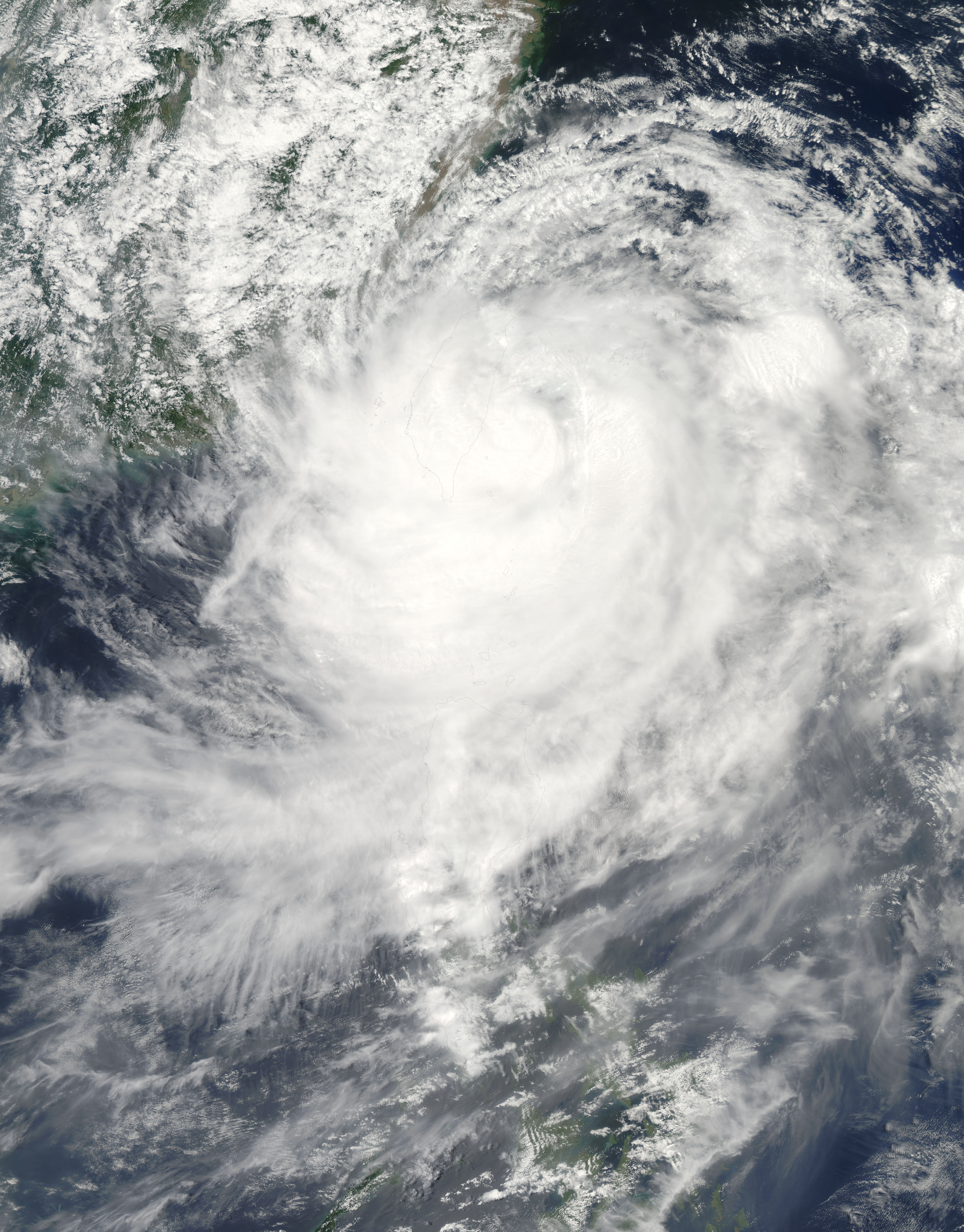
Typhoon Morakot

Wettest tropical cyclones and their remnants in Taiwan Highest-known totals
Precipitation			Storm	Location	Ref.
Rank	mm	in	Storm	Location	Ref.
1	3,060	120.47	Morakot 2009	Alishan, Chiayi	
2	2,319	91.30	Nari 2001	Wulai, New Taipei	
3	2,162	85.12	Flossie 1969	Beitou, Taipei	
4	1,987	78.23	Herb 1996	Alishan, Chiayi	
5	1,933	76.10	Gaemi 2024	Maolin, Kaoshiung	
6	1,774	69.84	Saola 2012	Yilan City	
7	1,725	67.91	Krathon 2024	Beinan, Taitung	
8	1,700	66.93	Lynn 1987	Taipei	
9	1,672	65.83	Clara 1967	Dongshan, Yilan	
10	1,611	63.43	Sinlaku 2008	Heping, Taichung	

== Thailand ==
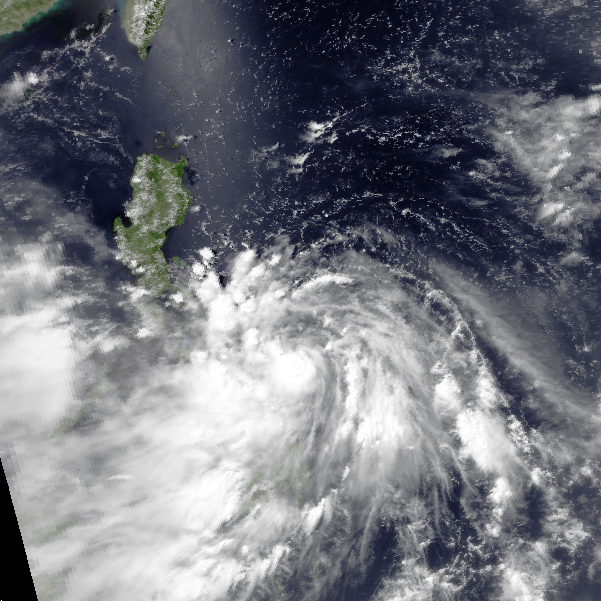
Typhoon Zeke (1991)

Tropical cyclones occasionally cross the Malay Peninsula from the northwest Pacific into the Bay of Bengal.

Wettest tropical cyclones and their remnants in Thailand Highest-known totals
Precipitation			Storm	Location	Ref.
Rank	mm	in	Storm	Location	Ref.
1	493.8	19.44	Zeke 1991	Khlong Yai	
2	470.0	18.50	Tilda 1964	At Somat	
3	342.0	13.46	Vae 1952	Chantaburi	
4	328.7	12.94	Ira 1990	Lop Buri	
5	322.6	12.70	Ed 1990	Takua Pa	
6	279.5	11.00	18W (2013)	Muang district	
7	273.6	10.77	Fred 1991	Khon Kaen	
8	257.3	10.13	Brian 1989	Takua Pa	
9	251.5	9.902	Muifa 2004	Prachaup Khirikhan	
10	239.5	9.429	Nell 1990	Ko Samui	

== Tonga ==
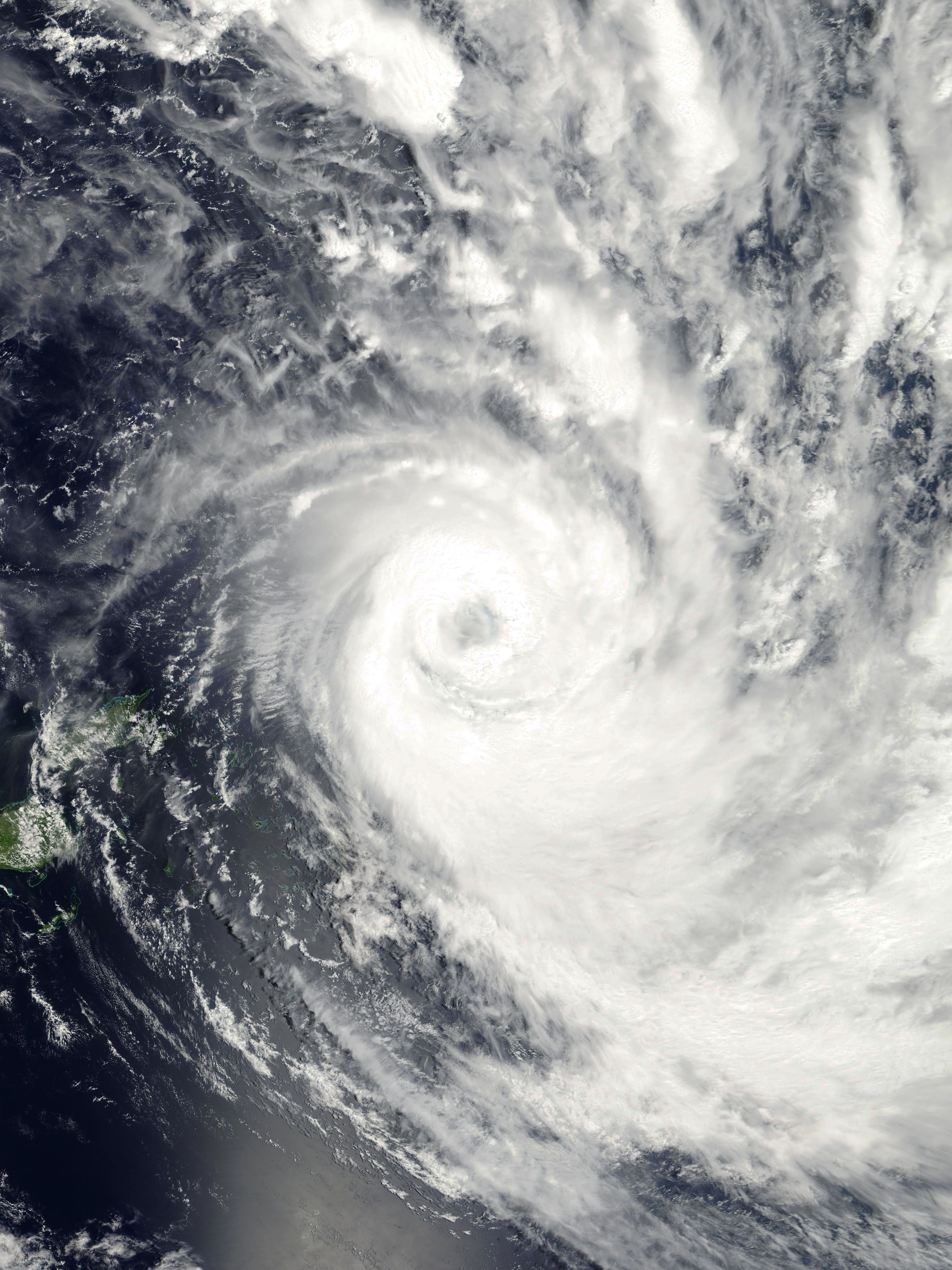
Cyclone Waka (2001)

Wettest tropical cyclones and their remnants in Tonga Highest-known totals
Precipitation			Storm	Location	Ref.
Rank	mm	in	Storm	Location	Ref.
1	200.0	7.87	Waka 2001		
2	167.0	6.57	Unnamed 1949	Nuku'alofa	
3	153.0	6.02	Lin 2009	Niuafo'ou	
4	152.2	6.00	Mick 2009	Fua'amotu	
5	149.0	5.87	Rene 2010	Fua'amotu	
6	120.0	4.72	Isaac 1982	Nuku'alofa	
7	120.0	4.72	Jasmine 2012	Tongatapu	
8	97.7	3.85	Vaianu 2006	Fuaʻamotu	
9	44.8	1.76	Cyril 2012	Vava'u	
10	37.5	1.48	Wilma 2011	Fua'amotu	

== United Kingdom ==
=== Mainland ===
Hurricane Bertha (2014)

Wettest tropical cyclones and their remnants in the United Kingdom Highest-known totals
Precipitation			Storm	Location	Ref.
Rank	mm	in	Storm	Location	Ref.
1	150.0	5.91	Bertha 2014	Inverness, Highland	
2	135.0	5.31	Charley 1986	Abergwyngregyn, Gwynedd	
3	130.0	5.12	Nadine 2012	Ravensworth, North Yorkshire	
4	76.0	2.99	Lili 1996	Chale Bay, Isle of Wight	
5	61.7	2.43	Zeta 2020	Chipping, Lancashire	
6	48.8	1.92	Grace 2009	Capel Curig, Conwy	
7	42.2	1.66	Gordon 2006	Wainfleet All Saints, Lincolnshire	
8	38.0	1.50	Gonzalo 2014	Glenmoriston, Highland	
9	31.0	1.22	Bill 2009	Shap, Cumbria	
10	30.0	1.18	Laura 2008	Windermere, Cumbria	

=== Anguilla ===
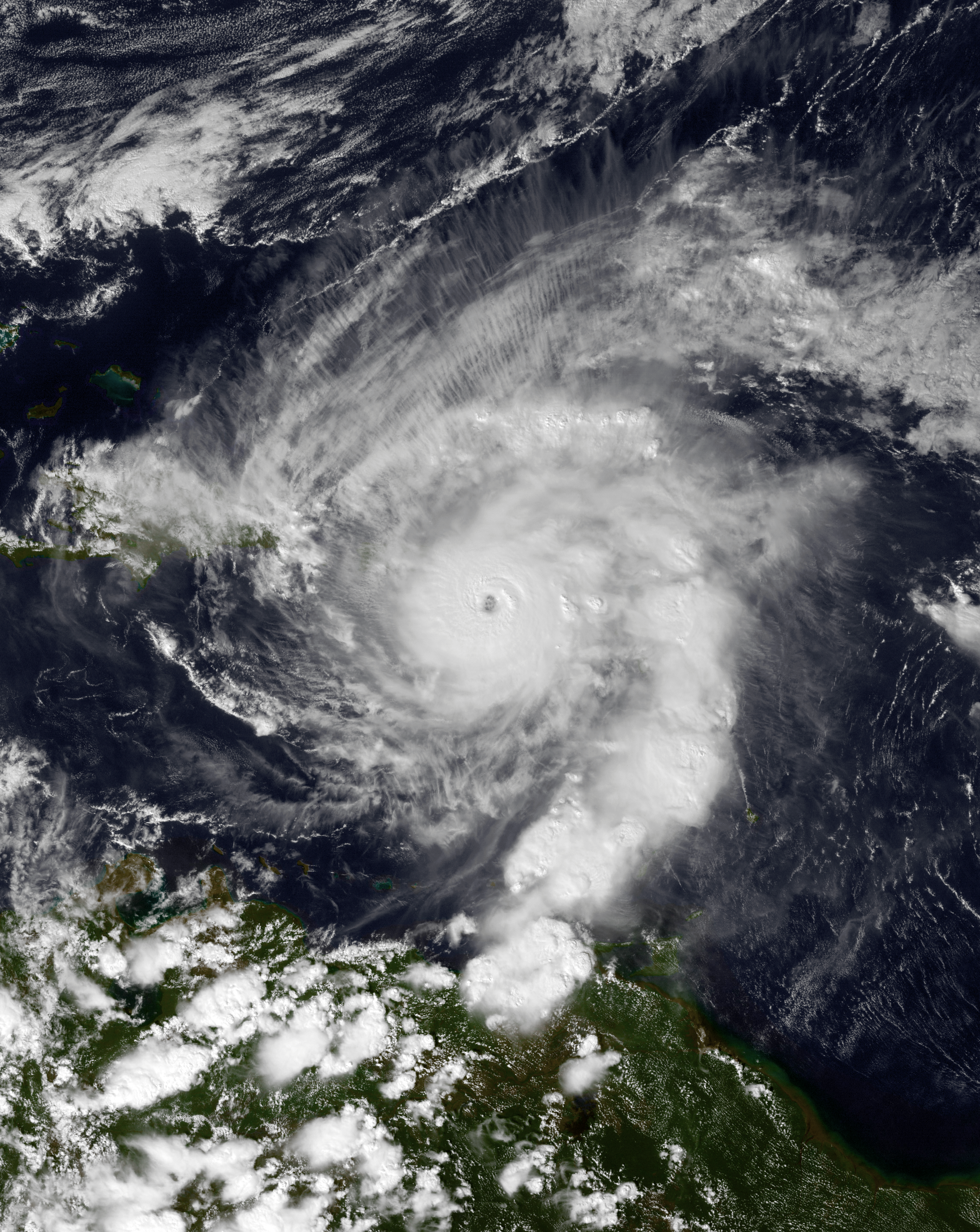
Hurricane Lenny (1999)

Wettest tropical cyclones and their remnants Anguilla Highest-known totals
Precipitation			Storm	Location	Ref.
Rank	mm	in	Storm	Location	Ref.
1	490.0	19.29	Lenny 1999		
2	380.0	14.96	Jose 1999		
3	250.0	9.84	Klaus 1990		
4	171.5	6.75	Alice 1954		

=== Bermuda ===
Bermuda has not historically received overwhelming rains out of tropical cyclones. This could be because of the rapid pace storms usually pass the island and the lack of mountains on the island.

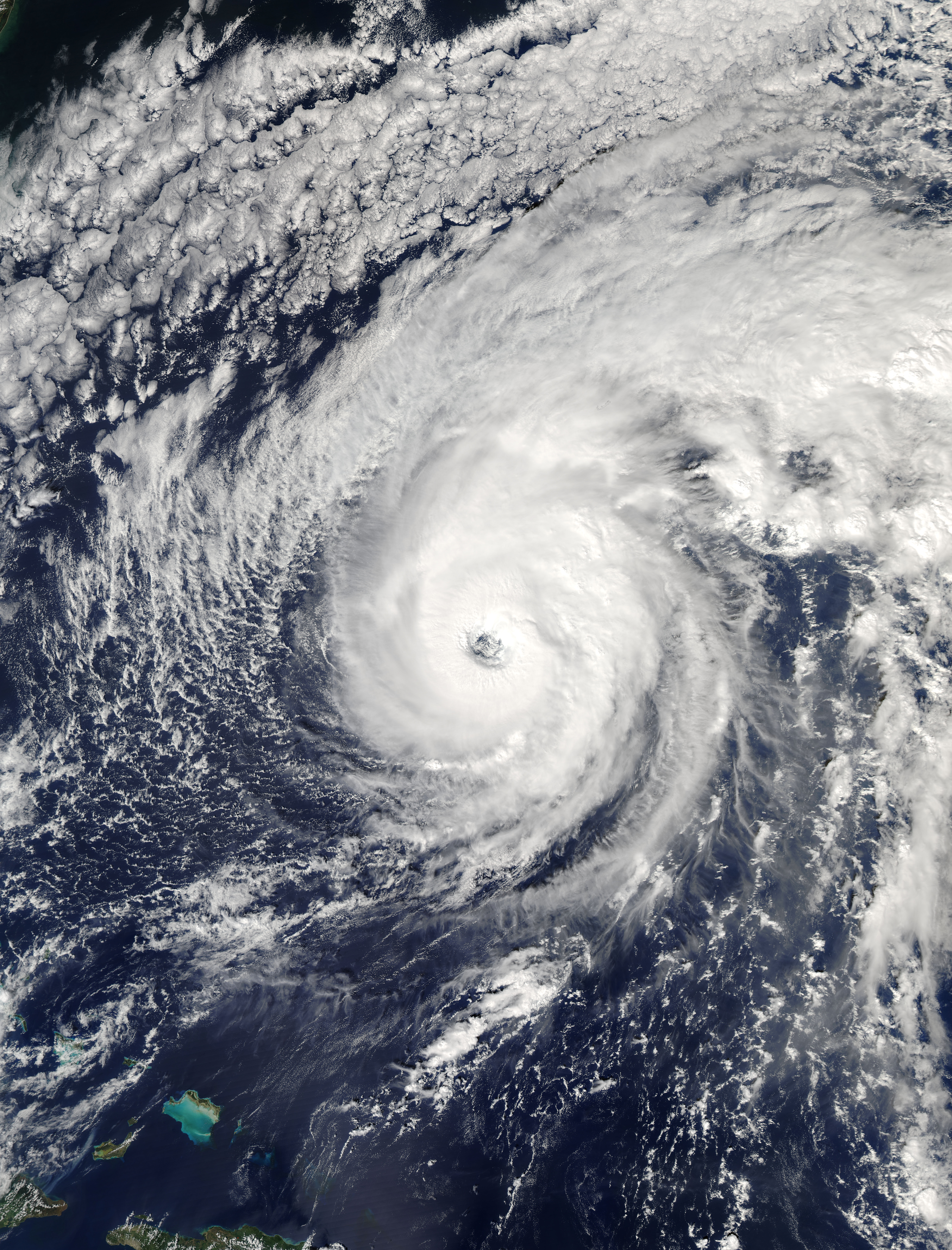
Hurricane Nicole (2016)

Wettest tropical cyclones and their remnants in Bermuda Highest-known totals
Precipitation			Storm	Location	Ref.
Rank	mm	in	Storm	Location	Ref.
1	186.7	7.35	October 1939 Hurricane		
2	177	7.0	Ernesto 2024		
3	172.0	6.77	Nicole 2016		
4	153.7	6.05	Arlene 1963		
5	151.4	5.96	Cristobal 2002		
6	148.0	5.83	Nicole 2004		
7	134.1	5.28	T.D. #23A 1967		
8	126.2	4.97	Franklin 2005		
9	125.0	4.92	Emily 1981		
10	124.0	4.88	Harvey 2005		

=== Cayman Islands ===
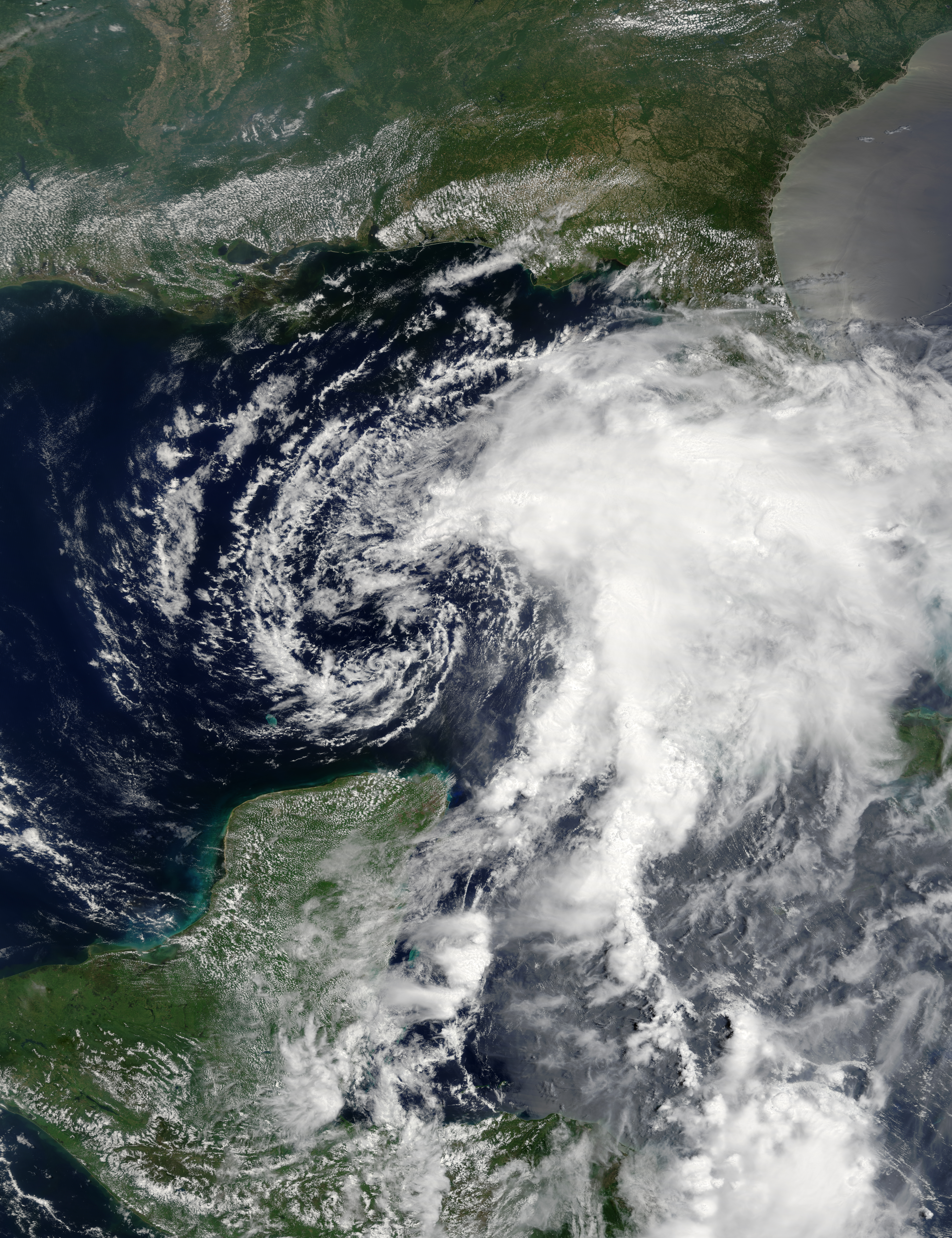
Tropical Storm Alberto

Wettest tropical cyclones and their remnants in the Cayman Islands Highest-known totals
Precipitation			Storm	Location	Ref.
Rank	mm	in	Storm	Location	Ref.
1	794.8	31.29	Unnamed, 1944	Grand Cayman Island	
2	577	22.72	Alberto, 2006	Owen Roberts International Airport	
3	552.2	21.74	Isidore, 2002	Cayman Brac	
4	451.4	17.77	Paloma, 2008	Cayman Brac	
5	308.4	12.14	Ivan, 2004	Grand Cayman Island	
6	292.1	11.50	Hattie, 1961	Grand Cayman Island	
7	250.7	9.87	Eta 2020	Grand Cayman	
8	229.1	9.02	Nicole, 2010	Owen Roberts International Airport	
9	165.6	6.52	Michelle, 2001	Grand Cayman Island	

== United States ==
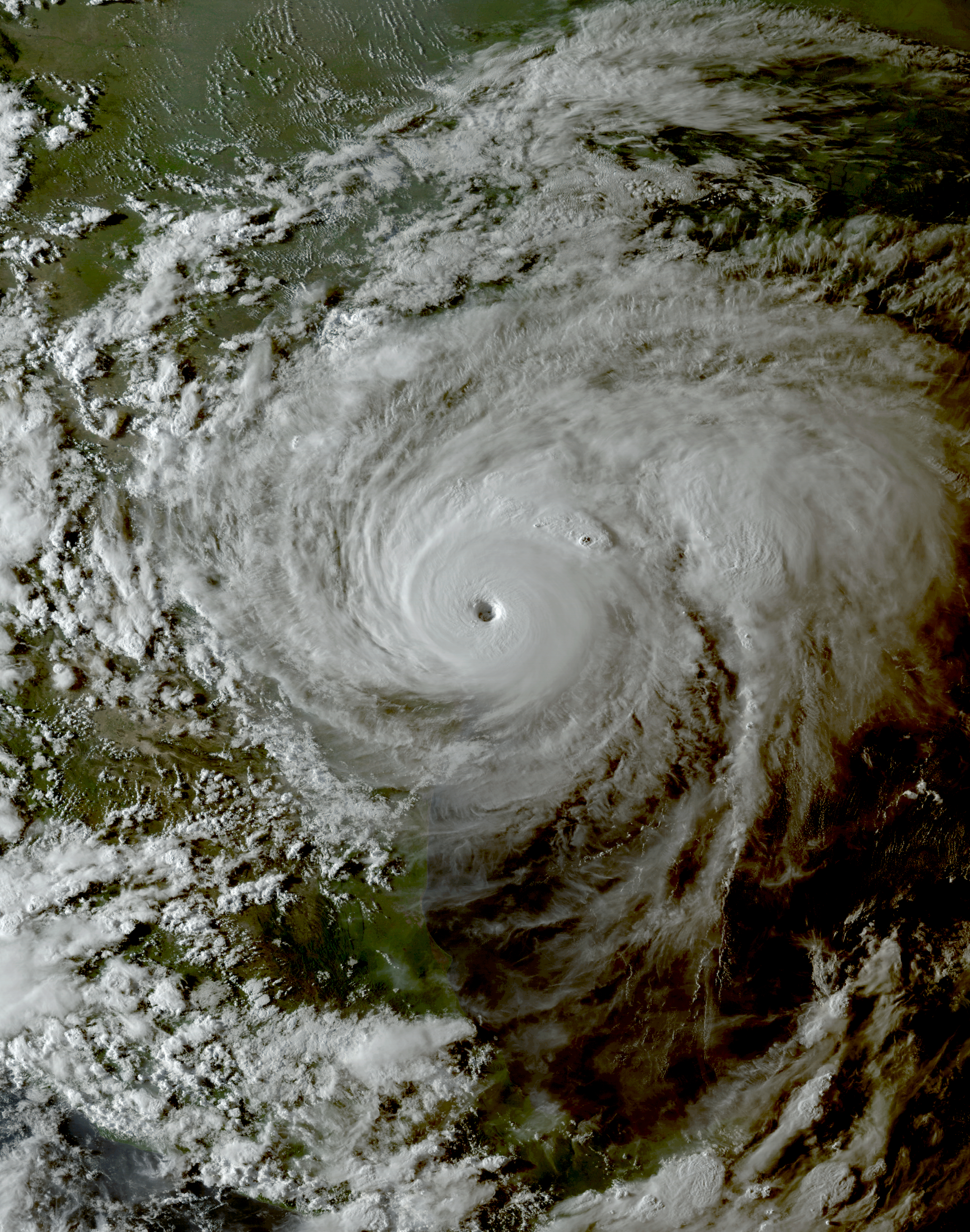
Hurricane Harvey (2017)

Wettest tropical cyclones and their remnants in the United States Highest-known totals
Precipitation			Storm	Location	Ref.
Rank	mm	in	Storm	Location	Ref.
1	1538.7	60.58	Harvey 2017	Nederland, Texas	
2	1321	52.02	Lane 2018	Mountainview, Hawaii	
3	1321	52.00	Hiki 1950	Kanalohuluhulu Ranger Station, Hawaii	
4	1219	48.00	Amelia 1978	Medina, Texas	
5	1148	45.20	Easy 1950	Yankeetown, Florida	
6	1143	45.00	Claudette 1979	Alvin, Texas	
7	1096	43.15	Imelda 2019	Jefferson County, Texas	
8	1058.7	41.68	T. D. #15 1970	Jayuya, Puerto Rico	
9	1033	40.68	Allison 2001	Northwest Jefferson County, Texas	
10	985	38.76	Paul 2000	Kapapala Ranch 36, Hawaii	

== Vanuatu ==
Cyclone Vania (2011)

Wettest tropical cyclones and their remnants in Vanuatu Highest-known totals
Precipitation			Storm	Location	Ref.
Rank	mm	in	Storm	Location	Ref.
1	847.6	33.37	Bola 1988	Lamap	
2	545.0	21.46	Dani 1999	Bauerfield Airport	
3	369.1	14.53	Vania 2011	Aneityum	
4	270.0	10.63	Eric 1985	Surukavian, Pentecost	
5	266.6	10.50	Sarah 1994	Santo-Pekoa International Airport	
6	254.4	10.02	Ivy 2004	Bauerfield Airport	
7	247.6	9.75	Anne 1988	Santo-Pekoa International Airport	
8	246.6	9.71	Nigel 1985	Santo-Pekoa International Airport	
9	223.7	8.81	Zuman 1998	Santo-Pekoa International Airport	
10	219.3	8.63	Esau 1992	Santo-Pekoa International Airport	

== Venezuela ==
A few tropical cyclones have skimmed the northern coast of South America over recent decades. Tropical Storm Bret (1993) dropped 339 millimetres (13.3 in) of rain in ten hours at Guanare, Portuguesa, Venezuela.

== Vietnam ==
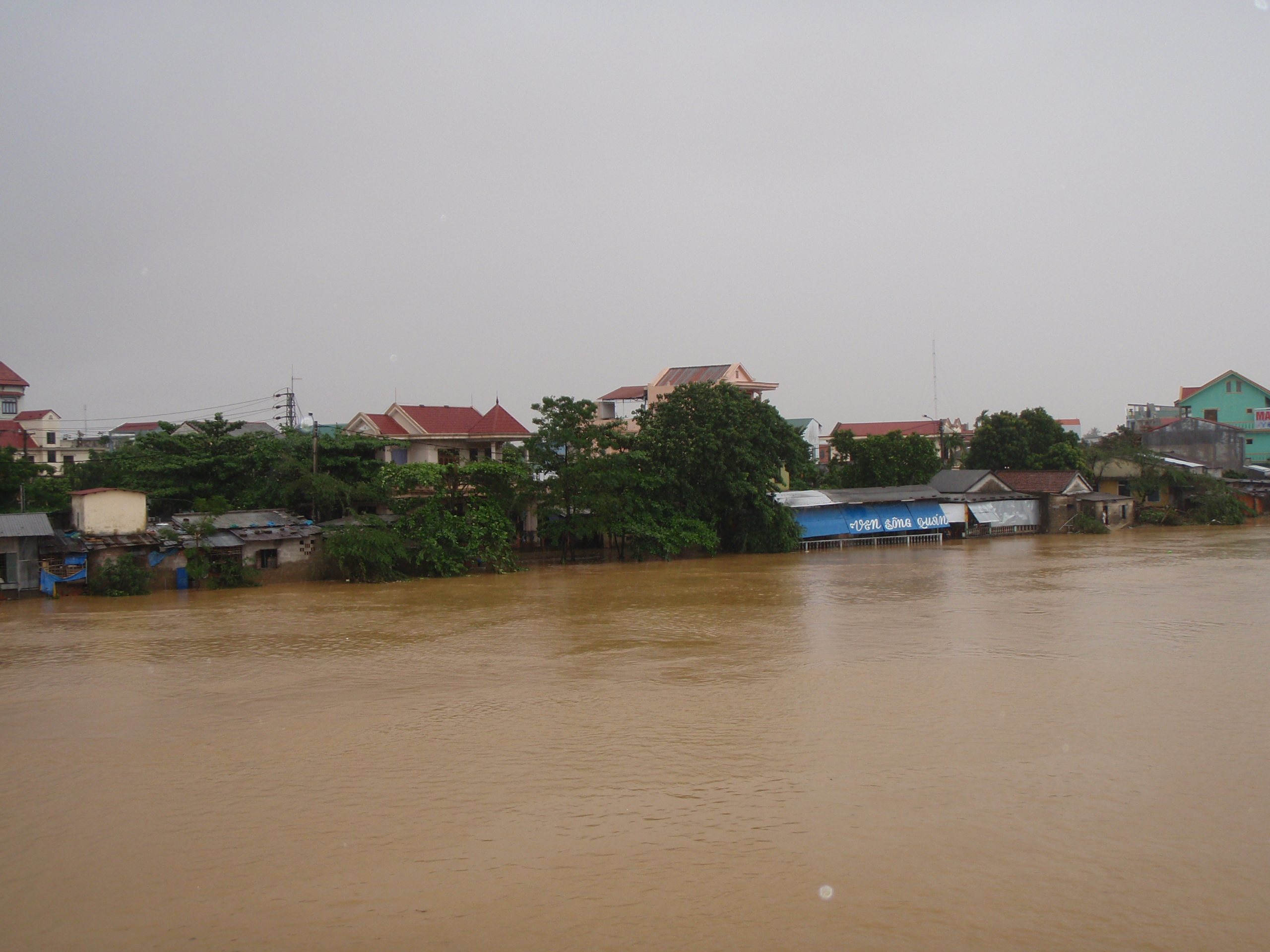
Flooding in Hue, Vietnam triggered by Typhoon Ketsana in 2009

Wettest tropical cyclones and their remnants in Vietnam Highest-known totals
Precipitation			Storm	Location	Ref.
Rank	mm	in	Storm	Location	Ref.
1	1,773	69.8	Peipah 2007	Nam Đông	
2	1,691	66.6	Ofel 2020	Kỳ Thượng	
3	1,369	53.9	06W 2007	Hương Khê	
4	1,239	48.8	September 2009 Vietnam tropical depression	Da Nang	
5	914	36.0	Ketsana 2009	Quảng Nam	
6	788	31.0	Lekima 2007		
7	747	29.4	Aere 2016	Đồng Hới, Quảng Bình	
8	699	27.5	Ira 1990		
9	666	26.2	Mirinae 2009	Vân Canh	
10	550	21.7	Xangsane 2006		

== See also ==
- China tropical cyclone rainfall climatology
- Extratropical cyclone
- List of the wettest tropical cyclones
- List of the wettest tropical cyclones in the United States
- Mexico tropical cyclone rainfall climatology
- Tropical cyclone
- Tropical cyclone rainfall climatology
- Tropical cyclone rainfall forecasting
- Tropical cyclogenesis
- United States tropical cyclone rainfall climatology
