= Hurricane Otto (2010) =

Category 1 Atlantic hurricane in 2010

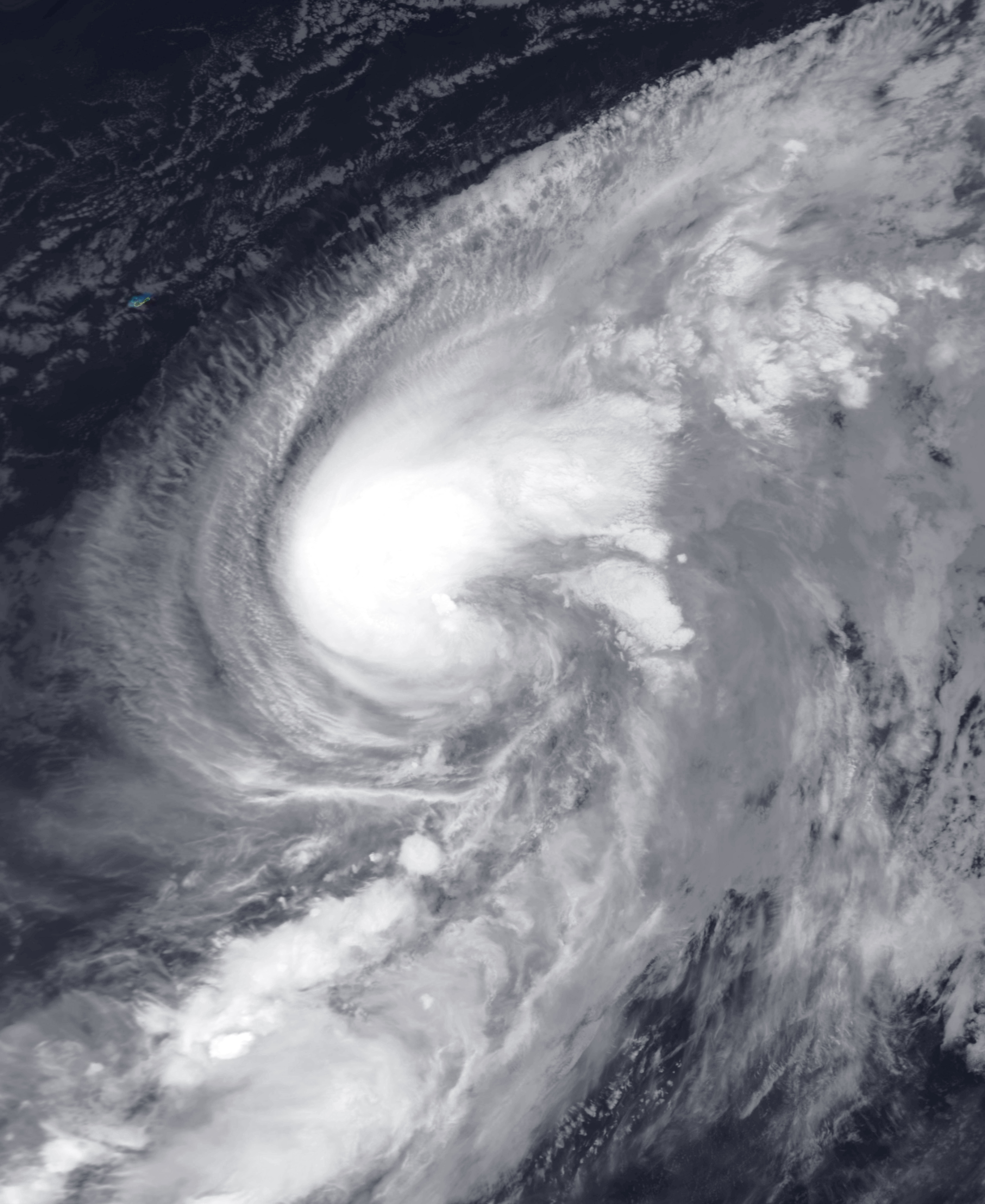
- Hurricane Otto at peak intensity on October 9

Meteorological history
- Formed: October 6, 2010
- Extratropical: October 10
- Dissipated: October 18, 2010

Category 1 hurricane
- 1-minute sustained (SSHWS/NWS)
- Highest winds: 85 mph (140 km/h)
- Lowest pressure: 976 mbar (hPa); 28.82 inHg

Overall effects
- Fatalities: None reported
- Damage: $22.5 million (2010 USD) (Preliminary estimate)
- Areas affected: Leeward Islands, Virgin Islands, Puerto Rico, Azores, Canary Islands
- IBTrACS
- Part of the 2010 Atlantic hurricane season

Hurricane Otto produced days of torrential rain over much of the northeastern Caribbean in October 2010. Otto originated as a subtropical cyclone lingering north of Puerto Rico on October 6, and transitioned into a tropical storm the next day, the fifteenth of the 2010 hurricane season. Accelerating toward the northeast, Otto strengthened into a Category 1 hurricane on the Saffir–Simpson scale on October 8, attaining peak winds of 85 mph (140 km/h). The storm began weakening due to incompatible surroundings and became extratropical west of the Azores on October 10. Otto was the first Atlantic tropical cyclone to transition from a subtropical storm since Tropical Storm Laura in 2008.

Drifting near the northeastern Caribbean for several days, Otto and its precursor disturbance brought prolonged rainfall to the Leeward Islands, the Virgin Islands, and Puerto Rico, triggering widespread flooding and numerous mudslides. Damage from the storm—in particular to roads, property and infrastructure—exceeded $22.5 million (2010 USD), but there were no fatalities. After recurving toward the northeast, Otto proceeded across the open Atlantic without affecting any other landmasses.

== Meteorological history ==
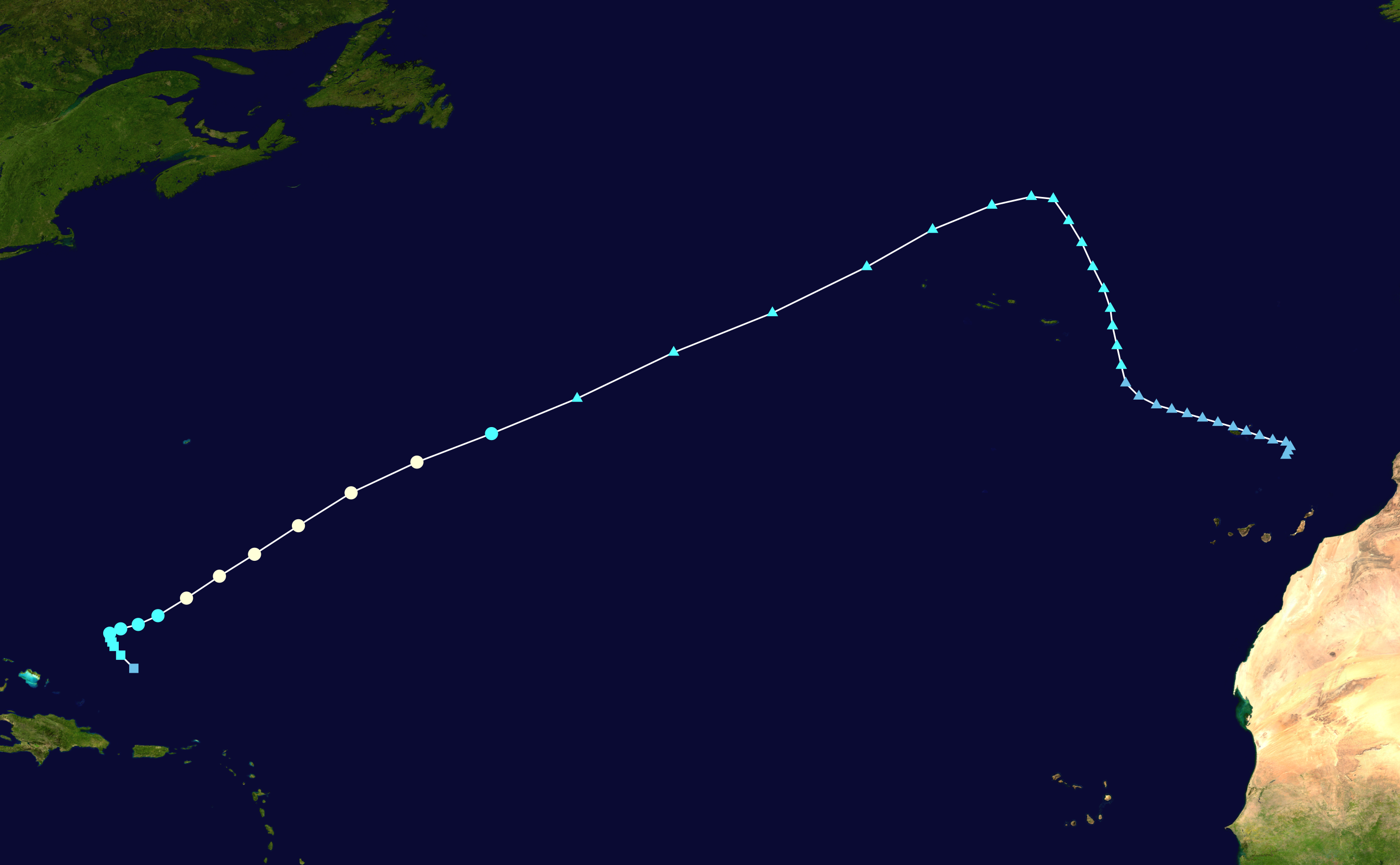
Map plotting the storm's track and intensity, according to the Saffir–Simpson scale Map key Saffir–Simpson scale Tropical depression (≤38 mph, ≤62 km/h) Tropical storm (39–73 mph, 63–118 km/h) Category 1 (74–95 mph, 119–153 km/h) Category 2 (96–110 mph, 154–177 km/h) Category 3 (111–129 mph, 178–208 km/h) Category 4 (130–156 mph, 209–251 km/h) Category 5 (≥157 mph, ≥252 km/h) Unknown Storm type Tropical cyclone Subtropical cyclone Extratropical cyclone, remnant low, tropical disturbance, or monsoon depression

In late September, a large area of disturbed weather associated with two tropical waves formed just east of the Lesser Antilles. The disturbance drifted very slowly west-northwestward, inhibited by strong wind shear that eventually caused the westernmost wave to dissipate. Albeit weak, an elongated remnant trough, or area of low pressure, persisted for several days, stalling over the extreme eastern Caribbean Sea as a nearby upper-level cyclonic vortex retrograded to its north. By October 5, the trough had drifted northward into a more favorable atmospheric environment over the Virgin Islands, which allowed the lowest pressures to extend to the surface. The low became well defined, interacting with the adjacent upper vortex to produce a wide convective band—a concentrated region in which strong showers and thunderstorms can form—over the northeastern Caribbean. Over the next day, the system continued to acquire a prominent subtropical structure, developing a markedly larger wind radius than typically seen in pure tropical cyclones. Satellite observations also revealed that although the lower wind circulation was distinct, it had become intertwined with the cyclonic vortex aloft to its southwest, confirming the hybrid nature of the system. The National Hurricane Center (NHC) thus classified the system as a subtropical depression at 06:00 UTC on October 6, when it was 265 mi (425 km) north-northwest of San Juan, Puerto Rico.

The depression slid slowly northwestward between the contiguous upper vortex and a large high-pressure region over the central Atlantic. A region of lighter wind shear ahead, as well as an anticipated weakening of the upper cyclone, prompted the NHC to introduce the possibility of a tropical transition. Later, satellite observations showed a rapid improvement in the depression's structure; convective banding wrapped completely around the broad inner wind field, which produced gusts to 65 mph (105 km/h). Accordingly, the NHC upgraded the depression to Subtropical Storm Otto at 21:00 UTC on October 6, about 215 mi (345 km) northeast of Grand Turk. Although satellite images continued to display a classical subtropical cyclone, with Otto's center and the vortex aloft nearly collocated, data from a Hurricane Hunters aircraft indicated a weak warm convective core was developing within the mid levels of the circulation—a feature normally present at the upper levels of tropical cyclones. Moreover, a contraction of the large wind field reaffirmed that Otto was entering the final stages of its tropical transition. Although convective activity briefly weakened overnight, weakening shear and considerably warmer sea surface temperatures permitted small patches of thunderstorms to refire on the morning of October 7. As Otto meandered northward, temperature contrasts from forecast models indicated that the warm core within the circulation had ascended to the upper levels of the cyclone. In consequence, a burst of deep, tropical convection with extreme cloud top temperatures of approximately −112 °F (−80 °C) occurred over the center. Having shed the last of its subtropical characteristics, Otto became a warm-core system and was operationally declared tropical at 1200 UTC that day.

Hurricane Otto weakening over the Atlantic on October 9

Over the course of October 8, Otto began to accelerate to the northeast under the increasing influence of a vertically deep trough off the US East Coast. Conditions aloft remained conducive, and the storm's convection deepened symmetrically over the center to form a large, well-defined central dense overcast. By 1200 UTC, Otto's winds had reached 75 mph (120 km/h) while a mid-level eyewall began to form, prompting the NHC to upgrade the storm to a Category 1 hurricane south of Bermuda. Further strengthening ensued as the newly formed hurricane proceeded over the warm waters of the central Atlantic; microwave imagery revealed the eye, though obscured, was vertically well established, marking Otto's peak strength with estimated winds of 85 mph (140 km/h).

Upon peaking in intensity, Otto had become fully embedded within the deep-layered flow to its southwest. Racing northeastward, the hurricane entered an area of progressively cooler waters and adverse upper atmospheric conditions, which eroded its cloud pattern and disrupted the circulation. With maximum winds dropping below 70 mph (110 km/h), Otto was reduced to a tropical storm late on October 9. Convective activity came to a near halt due to relentless wind shear and a lack of tropical moisture, leading specialists to conclude the storm was entering an extratropical transition. The next day, the cool dry air infiltrated the weak warm core, and Otto began to develop frontal banding features. With these characteristics, Otto became an extratropical cyclone on October 10, and the NHC discontinued advisories on the storm. The post-tropical cyclone decelerated near the Azores over the next week, where it eventually degenerated into a remnant low that recurved sharply southeastward, before completely dissipating west of Morocco on October 18.

== Preparations and impact ==
Otto shortly after completing tropical cyclogenesis

Otto and its precursor disturbance produced days of prolonged rainfall and gusty winds across the northern Leeward Islands, the Virgin Islands, and Puerto Rico. Localized flooding and rough sea conditions caused extensive road damage, infrastructure failures, and some beach erosion along coastlines. During the passage of the storm, numerous residents were left without water and power, and a state of emergency was declared for several Caribbean nations. Schools, businesses and some government offices across all of the Virgin Islands and Saint Kitts and Nevis were closed until storm conditions abated. The weather system ultimately accounted for substantial monetary losses throughout these areas, pinned at over $22.5 million (2010 USD). In addition, Otto was widely regarded as one of the wettest storms in the history of the northeastern Caribbean, repeatedly shattering various rainfall records.

=== Leeward Islands ===
Wettest tropical cyclones and their remnants on Saint Martin/Sint Maarten Highest-known totals
Precipitation			Storm	Location	Ref.
Rank	mm	in	Storm	Location	Ref.
1	700.0	27.56	Lenny 1999	Meteorological Office, Phillpsburg	
2	280.2	11.03	Jose 1999	Princess Juliana International Airport	
3	165.1	6.50	Luis 1995		
4	111.7	4.40	Otto 2010	Princess Juliana International Airport	
5	92.3	3.63	Rafael 2012	Princess Juliana International Airport	
6	51.0	2.01	Laura 2020	Princess Juliana International Airport	
7	42.6	1.68	Isaias 2020	Princess Juliana International Airport	
8	7.9	0.31	Ernesto 2012	Princess Juliana International Airport	
9	7.0	0.28	Chantal 2013	Princess Juliana International Airport	
10	6.6	0.26	Dorian 2013	Princess Juliana International Airport	

In Saint Lucia, downpours triggered torrential flooding along the island's easternmost coast from October 5 through October 6. In Dennery Quarter, flash floods affected about 500 households; among them, 400 had their houses flooded or severely damaged. Several residences had to be evacuated, and some people were trapped in their homes. Residents also suffered from the absence of drinking water, lack of electricity, and the inability to prepare meals due to the loss of kitchen equipment and other utensils. In response, the area was declared a disaster zone; a total of EC$500,000 ($185,185 USD) was approved to assist flood victims, as well as an additional US$44,194 allocated from the Disaster Relief Emergency Fund of the International Federation of Red Cross and Red Crescent Societies.

Intermittent torrents battered Saint Kitts and Nevis for at least four days; a total of up to 10.99 inches (279 mm) of precipitation was recorded during that time. Several homeowners reported significant flooding, and a number of persons had to be rescued from their homes. Gusty winds generated rough sea conditions along coastal regions, resulting in some beach erosion and the collapse of a sidewalk section. Rains and associated floods topped a number of culverts and bridges, washed out the sides of some roadways, and damage to some utility lines, followed by significant disruptions to electricity services. The exact amount of damage to the territory remains unknown, however.

Subtropical Depression Seventeen to the north of Puerto Rico, with its long rainband reaching into the northeastern Caribbean

In the U.S. Virgin Islands, heavy rainfall associated with Otto shattered numerous records for October across the US Virgin Islands, with a maximum total of 21.52 in (547 mm) reported in Red Hook, Saint Tomas. The rain flooded roads and prompted officials opened shelters on all three islands on October 6. In Saint Croix, a roadway section leading into Enfield Green collapsed, temporarily cutting the neighborhood off to traffic until a makeshift roadway was created the next day. In La Vallée, on the island's north shore, floods and landslides affected low-lying areas. Traffic on Saint Thomas and Saint John initially remained unhindered; however, as the rain continued for several days, flooding, rockslides and asphalt erosion forced authorities to close several roads and highways. Damage estimates from the storm reached $2 million across the islands.

In the British Virgin Islands, a flash flood warning was in effect during the presence of Otto from October 6 to 8. Torrential floods across the islands overturned several cars, and caused extensive damage to utility lines and drainage pipes; dozens of people in Tortola—specifically in Road Town—were temporarily left without power and water. In total, an estimated 24.98 inches (634 mm) of rain was recorded, and the government declared a state of emergency for the entire territory. Floods from the storm were regarded as the worst in the history of the British Virgin Islands. In total, damage across the islands was estimated at US$10.5 million, considerably higher than losses ensured by major Hurricane Earl earlier in the year.

Widespread flooding from Otto was responsible for substantial increases in damage to the road network across Sint Maartin initially wrought by Earl, amounting to NAƒ1.5 million ($838,000 USD). On the French side of the island nation, torrents and associated floods in Saint Martin were accountable for similar property infrastructural damage; monetary losses there totaled €800,000 ($1.12 million USD).

=== Puerto Rico ===
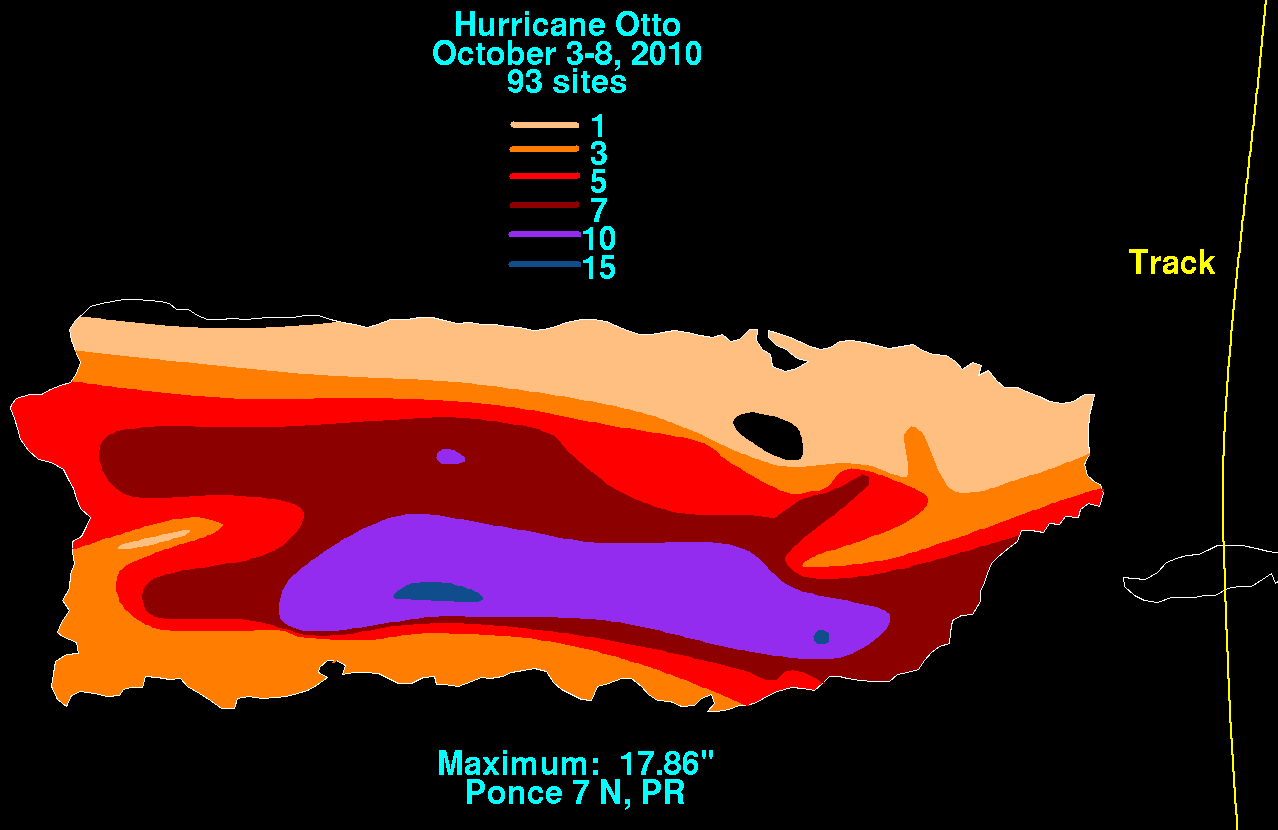
Storm total rainfall related to Otto in Puerto Rico

Rain began to pour across several parts of Puerto Rico on October 5, persisting for up to five days in some areas. The greatest amount of rainfall during the six-day period of October 3 to 8 was registered at Rio Portugues in Ponce, with 17.86 inches (454 mm) recorded. Due to the rainfall, the Government of Puerto Rico issued the closure of more than 40 roads, and an additional 19 streets were partially secured. Subsequent widespread flooding affected at least 295 roads, 14 of which suffered significant damage. In all, damage to road infrastructure was preliminarily estimated at US$6.5 million. In addition, the municipality of Ponce reported copious losses in agriculture, later estimated at US$1.5 million.

Following the overflow of the Arecibo River on October 7, a neighborhood in Utuado was cut off from surrounding communities after gushing waters severely damaged its main road. Shortly thereafter, a landslide lugged a utility pole along the road, making it impossible for larger vehicles—including ambulances—to access the site. Landslides trapped fourteen families in the municipality of Ponce; a residence alongside a road suffered significant damage and had to be evacuated. In Cayey, a district was isolated from neighboring areas due to the collapse of a bridge. In the area, burst riverbanks triggered floods across local streets, which trapped dozens of families in their homes. Severe flooding contaminated water supplies, leaving an estimated 45,000 people without drinking water in the wake of the storm. In response, the government declared a state of emergency for the entire island. Authorities opened 120 shelters, and several flood victims had to be rescued.

== See also ==
- List of Category 1 Atlantic hurricanes
- Hurricane Rafael (2012)
