= List of storms named Rafael =

The name Rafael has been used for two tropical cyclones in the Atlantic Ocean.

- Hurricane Rafael (2012) – long-lived Category 1 hurricane that formed in the Northeastern Caribbean Sea, then affected Europe as an extratropical low
- Hurricane Rafael (2024) – late-season Category 3 hurricane that made landfall in western Cuba, then dissipated in the Gulf of Mexico
