= Hurricane Rafael (2012) =

Category 1 Atlantic hurricane in 2012

- Hurricane Rafael near peak intensity on October 16

Meteorological history
- Formed: October 12, 2012
- Extratropical: October 17, 2012
- Dissipated: October 26, 2012

Category 1 hurricane
- 1-minute sustained (SSHWS/NWS)
- Highest winds: 90 mph (150 km/h)
- Lowest pressure: 969 mbar (hPa); 28.61 inHg

Overall effects
- Fatalities: 1 total
- Damage: ≤$2 million (2012 USD)
- Areas affected: Lesser Antilles, Puerto Rico, Bermuda, Atlantic Canada, United States East Coast, Azores, Western Europe
- IBTrACS
- Part of the 2012 Atlantic hurricane season

Hurricane Rafael was a long-lived category 1 hurricane that produced minor damage in the northeastern Caribbean Sea and affected the coastlines of Atlantic Canada in mid-October 2012. The seventeenth named storm and ninth hurricane of the 2012 hurricane season, Rafael originated from a tropical wave roughly 230 mi (370 km) south-southeast of Saint Croix on October 12; because the system already contained tropical storm-force winds, it skipped tropical depression status. Though initially disorganized due to moderate wind shear, a subsequent decrease allowed for shower and thunderstorm activity to develop in earnest by October 14, 2012. While moving north-northwestward the following morning, Rafael intensified into a Category 1 hurricane. A cold front off the East Coast of the United States caused the system to turn northward and eventually northeastward by October 16, 2012, at which time Rafael attained its peak intensity with maximum sustained winds of 90 mph (150 km/h). As the cyclone entered a more stable atmosphere and tracked across increasingly cooler sea surface temperatures, it began extratropical transition, a process the system completed by the following afternoon. However, Rafael's extratropical remnant persisted for another nine days, with the storm looping around a larger extratropical low over the north-central Atlantic, before turning southeastward and then eastward. Rafael's remnant later made landfall on Portugal on October 26, before dissipating later that day.

As a disorganized tropical cyclone in the northeastern Caribbean, Rafael produced major flooding across the region. As much as a foot of rain fell across portions of the Lesser Antilles, causing mudslides, landslides, and river flooding. In addition, the heavy rains led to significant crop loss. Sustained winds near hurricane force were recorded on Saint Martin, while tropical storm-force gusts occurred widespread. Lightning activity as a result of heavy thunderstorms caused many fires and power outages. One fatality occurred when a woman in Guadeloupe unsuccessfully attempted to drive her car across a flooded roadway. As Rafael passed just to the east of Bermuda as a hurricane, light rainfall was recorded. Gusts over 50 mph (80 km/h) left hundreds of houses without electricity. Large swells from the system caused significant damage to the coastline of Nova Scotia, while many roads were washed away or obscured with debris, but overall, damage was minimal.

== Meteorological history ==
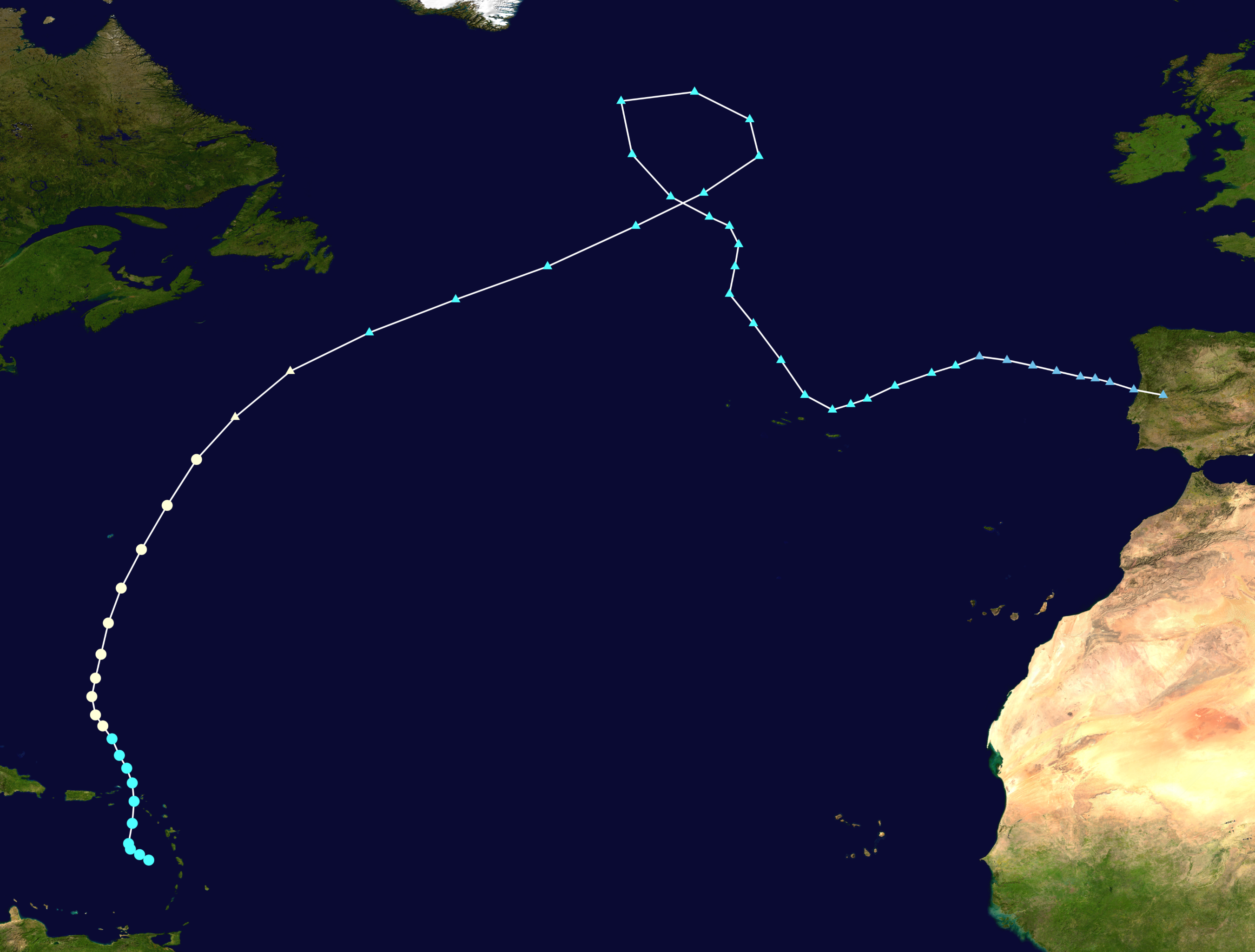
Map plotting the storm's track and intensity, according to the Saffir–Simpson scale Map key Saffir–Simpson scale Tropical depression (≤38 mph, ≤62 km/h) Tropical storm (39–73 mph, 63–118 km/h) Category 1 (74–95 mph, 119–153 km/h) Category 2 (96–110 mph, 154–177 km/h) Category 3 (111–129 mph, 178–208 km/h) Category 4 (130–156 mph, 209–251 km/h) Category 5 (≥157 mph, ≥252 km/h) Unknown Storm type Tropical cyclone Subtropical cyclone Extratropical cyclone, remnant low, tropical disturbance, or monsoon depression

The formation of Hurricane Rafael is attributed to a low-latitude tropical wave that emerged off the western coast of Africa on October 5. The wave remained disorganized until roughly midway between the Cape Verde Islands and Lesser Antilles, at which time a broad area of low pressure developed and convection began to consolidate around it. As a result, the disturbance was introduced into the National Hurricane Center (NHC)'s 48-hour Tropical Weather Outlook with a low chance of tropical development. These chances were subsequently raised as further development occurred, with the system receiving a medium chance of development early on October 10, and a high chance of development as it approached the southern Leeward Islands late the following evening. As the wave crossed into the eastern Caribbean Sea and slowed down, the previously broad and open surface low consolidated and became stacked with the mid-level center. The disturbance was already producing tropical storm-force winds, and as a result, skipped tropical depression status to become Tropical Storm Rafael at 1800 UTC on October 12. At this time, the cyclone was located roughly 200 mi (320 km) south-southeast of Saint Croix.

Despite being named, Rafael remained disorganized initially; this was the result of the interaction between an upper-level trough and the cyclone itself. Moderate to strong wind shear dislocated the center of Rafael and the deepest shower and thunderstorm activity. Over the course of the next few days, however, the upper-level trough gradually weakened and backed westward, allowing for the development of an anticyclone atop the tropical storm. Wind shear lessened, allowing the center to become obscured from view and outflow to develop in association with the system. As it began to execute a turn towards the north under the influence of an upper-level trough to its west, a central dense overcast (CDO) was noted on satellite imagery. Following a series of intensity estimates, Rafael was upgraded to a hurricane around 0600 UTC on October 15, while positioned about 650 mi (1045 km) south of Bermuda, although this intensity was speculated upon until later that afternoon following a hurricane hunters flight into the system.

Hurricane Rafael's extratropical remnant on October 22, approaching Portugal.

As Rafael moved northward, it continued to intensify rapidly, in spite of moderate wind shear. An eye became visible on microwave imagery during the morning hours of October 16, during which time the cyclone attained its peak intensity as a Category 1 hurricane with maximum sustained winds of 90 mph (150 km/h) and a minimum barometric pressure of 969 mb (hPa; 28.61 inHg). By the afternoon hours of that same day, data from an Air Force Reserve reconnaissance aircraft indicated that Rafael was on the verge of a weakening trend, attributed to decreasing sea surface temperatures and higher wind shear. Though the system retained hurricane-force winds, it began to transition into an extratropical cyclone on October 17, a process it completed by 1800 UTC that same day, after interacting with a cold front; at the time of the transition, Rafael was positioned well southwest of Nova Scotia. For the next couple of days, Rafael's remnant accelerated northeastward across the north-central Atlantic Ocean, before proceeding to loop counterclockwise around a larger extratropical low for two days, to the southeast of Greenland, from October 19 to 20. During this time, Rafael's extratropical remnant strengthened even further, with the storm's minimum central pressure bottoming out at 966 millibars (28.5 inHg) at 00:00 UTC on October 20. Afterward, the cyclone's remnant resumed its eastward motion, meandering towards the southeast for a few days, before turning eastward on October 23, while situated over the Azores. Rafael's extratropical remnant gradually weakened over the next few days, as it moved towards Portugal. Rafael's remnant later made landfall on Portugal on October 26, before dissipating by 1800 UTC that day.

== Preparations and impact ==
=== Caribbean islands ===
Rafael over the Lesser Antilles on October 13

Shortly after the development of Rafael, a tropical storm watch was issued for the island of Puerto Rico; tropical storm warnings were issued for surrounding locations, including the British and U.S. Virgin Islands. By the morning hours of October 13, the warnings were discontinued for Saint Lucia and Martinique, but issued for Culebra and Vieques. The warnings were discontinued for Guadeloupe and Saint Martin by the pre-dawn hours of the following morning as Rafael pulled away, and expired for the remaining northeastern Caribbean Islands several hours later. In preparation for the system, the Virgin Islands Territorial Management Agency (VITEMA) activated several emergency operation centers across the region, and requested assistance from the Federal Emergency Management Agency (FEMA), who deployed a team of workers to cover the aftermath of Rafael. The departments of public works and power authority placed emergency crews on standby, while all ports out of the U.S. Virgin Islands were open to outbound vessel traffic only; the Coast Guard advised mariners to prepare for impending severe weather.

As a tropical storm, Rafael hit Guadeloupe with large amounts of rain, causing significant damage to homes and especially crops. According to Météo-France, up to 5.9 inches (150 mm) fell in 3 hours in the prefecture of Basse-Terre, and up to 12 inches (300 mm) in 48 hours between October 13 and 14; an estimated 7.9 inches (200 mm) fell during that same timeframe in Grande-Terre. Flooding and mudslides as a result of the heavy rain damaged 60 to 80% of the vegetable crops in Grande-Terre, and lightning as a result of strong storms sparked fires and led to power outages. Sustained winds of 24 mph (39 km/h) and gusts reaching 42 mph (68 km/h) occurred in Raizet; gusts reached 64 mph (103 km/h) in La Désirade. A woman was killed in Matouba, part of Saint-Claude, after attempting to drive her car across a flooded roadway; she was swept away. Heavy rains in St. Kitts, amounting to 11.87 in (301 mm) in a 30‑hour span, caused significant flooding and mudslides, especially around Basseterre. Traffic across the area was paralyzed as roads became impassable, and most businesses were closed for the duration of the storm. Many residents lost power and water supply as well. A few people attempted to drive through flooded roads and required rescue. Numerous weather stations in the French islands of Saint Barthélémy and Saint Martin recorded gusts of 63 mph (101 km/h) and 67 mph (108 km/h), respectively. Although several boats were grounded, overall damage remained fairly minor in the French territories. Road 2 between Manati, Puerto Rico and Vega Baja, Puerto Rico was flooded; several houses were also flooded at Toa Alta High.

=== Bermuda ===
As Rafael exited the northeastern Caribbean Sea, a tropical storm watch was issued for Bermuda on October 14. This watch was subsequently upgraded to a tropical storm warning the following morning, but was dropped by early on October 17 as the system passed northeast of the island. In advance of the system, residents were urged to take their typical precautionary measures; in addition, the main two airlines on Bermuda—WestJet and United Airlines—cancelled hundreds of flights on October 16. Officials warned of minor storm surge along low-lying coasts, while the Bermuda Weather Service (BWS) warned of two to four inches of rainfall. Winds, while stronger than locals expected, did not cause significant damage. The BWS noted that sustained winds of 34 mph (55 km/h), and gusts reaching 51 mph (82 km/h), occurred at the L.F. Wade International Airport as the storm made its closest approach; these winds left about 600 houses without electricity according to the Bermuda Electric Light Company. Rainfall was less than originally feared, peaking at 1.71 inches (43 mm).

=== Newfoundland ===
Though tropical cyclone watches and warnings were not issued, city officials in St. John's recommended all residents in Newfoundland to prepare for Rafael. Large swells and storm surge produced by the post-tropical cyclone caused extensive damage along the Avalon Peninsula. According to locals, the waves were more intense than during Hurricane Igor, a cyclone which devastated the region during the 2010 Atlantic hurricane season. Large sections of roads were washed out or covered in debris left behind by the waves. Near Trepassey, the local breakwater was destroyed in three sections, allowing waves to wash inland. As a result, a 9.1 m (30 ft) wide and 1.5 m (5 ft) deep gap in one of the main roads was left behind. In an area known as the Lower Coast, 50 people were cut off from the surrounding area. Overall damage in the area was estimated at C$1–2 million. Rainfall associated with the storm was light, amounting to 6 mm (0.24 in) in Cape Race.

== See also ==
- Other storms of the same name
- Timeline of the 2012 Atlantic hurricane season
- List of Bermuda hurricanes
- Hurricane Jose (1999)
- Hurricane Otto (2010)
