= 2012 Pacific hurricane season =

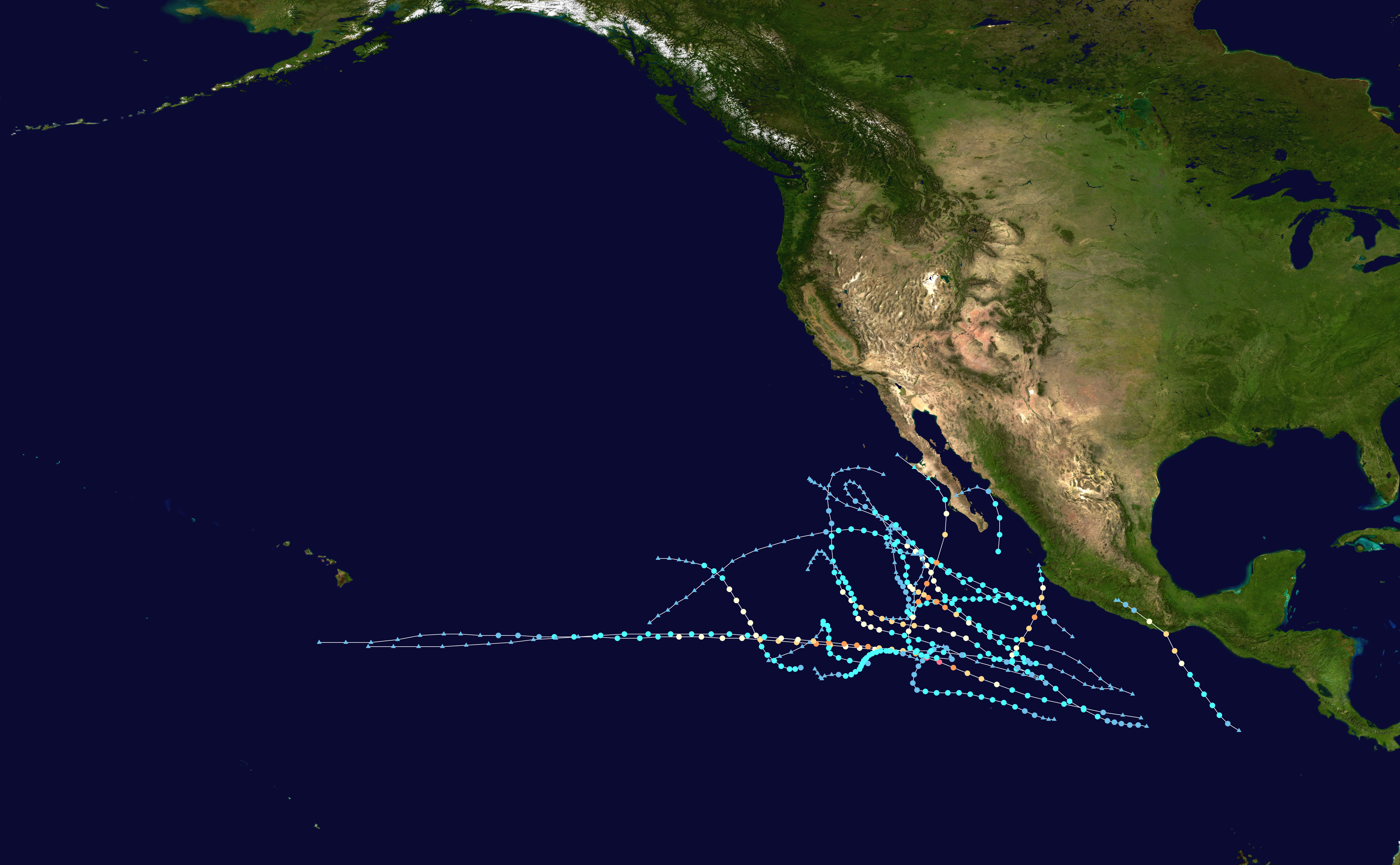
- Season summary map

Seasonal boundaries
- First system formed: May 14, 2012
- Last system dissipated: November 3, 2012

Strongest storm
- Name: Emilia
  - Maximum winds: 140 mph (220 km/h) (1-minute sustained)
  - Lowest pressure: 945 mbar (hPa; 27.91 inHg)

Seasonal statistics
- Total depressions: 17
- Total storms: 17
- Hurricanes: 10
- Major hurricanes (Cat. 3+): 5
- ACE: 98.2
- Total fatalities: 8 total
- Total damage: $28 million (2012 USD)

Related articles
- Timeline of the 2012 Pacific hurricane season; 2012 Atlantic hurricane season; 2012 Pacific typhoon season; 2012 North Indian Ocean cyclone season

The 2012 Pacific hurricane season was a moderately active Pacific hurricane season that saw an unusually high number of tropical cyclones pass west of the Baja California Peninsula. The season officially began on May 15 in the eastern Pacific Ocean (east of 140°W), and on June 1 in the central Pacific (from 140°W to the International Date Line, north of the equator; they both ended on November 30. These dates conventionally delimit the period of each year when most tropical cyclones form in these regions of the Pacific Ocean. However, the formation of tropical cyclones is possible at any time of the year. This season's first system, Tropical Storm Aletta, formed on May 14, and the last, Tropical Storm Rosa, dissipated on November 3.

Hurricane Bud intensified into the first major hurricane of the season, one of three to do so in the month of May. In mid-June, Hurricane Carlotta came ashore near Puerto Escondido, Mexico. Seven people were killed by Carlotta and damage amounted to US$12.4 million. Hurricane Paul brought significant damage to Baja California Sur. Tropical Storms Hector, John, Kristy, and Norman, as well as Hurricane Fabio all threatened land; however, damage from these storms were relatively minor.

== Seasonal forecasts ==
Predictions of tropical activity in the 2012 season
Source	Date	Named storms	Hurricanes	Major hurricanes	Ref
Average (1971–2006)		15.3	8.8	4.2
Record high activity		27	16 (tie)	11
Record low activity		8 (tie)	3	0 (tie)
CPC	May 24, 2012	12–18	5–9	2–5
	Actual activity	17	10	5

In advance of each Pacific hurricane season, forecasts of hurricane activity are issued by the United States National Oceanic and Atmospheric Administration (NOAA)'s Climate Prediction Center and Mexico's Servicio Meteorológico Nacional (SMN). These include weekly and monthly changes in significant factors that help determine the number of tropical storms, hurricanes, and major hurricanes within a particular year. According to NOAA, the average eastern Pacific hurricane season between 1971 and 2006 contained roughly 15 tropical storms, 8 hurricanes, 3 major hurricanes, with a near-normal accumulated cyclone energy (ACE) index of 113. Broadly speaking, ACE is a measure of the power of a tropical or subtropical storm multiplied by the length of time it existed. It is only calculated for full advisories on specific tropical and subtropical systems reaching or exceeding wind speeds of 39 mph (63 km/h). NOAA typically categorizes a season as above-average, average, or below-average based on the cumulative ACE index, but the number of tropical storms, hurricanes, and major hurricanes within a hurricane season is sometimes also considered.

On May 24, the Climate Prediction Center released its pre-season outlook. The scientists stated a 30% chance of a below-normal season, a 50% chance of a near-normal season and a 20% chance of an above-normal season. The climatologists expected 12–18 named storms, with 5–9 becoming hurricanes, and 2–5 becoming major hurricanes. The below-normal activity forecast was because of increased wind shear and a high expectation of El Niño–Southern Oscillation (ENSO)-neutral conditions throughout the peak in the later months of summer, together with lingering La Niña conditions at the beginning of the season, even though there had already been two named systems – one tropical storm and one major hurricane – in the month of May.

== Seasonal summary ==
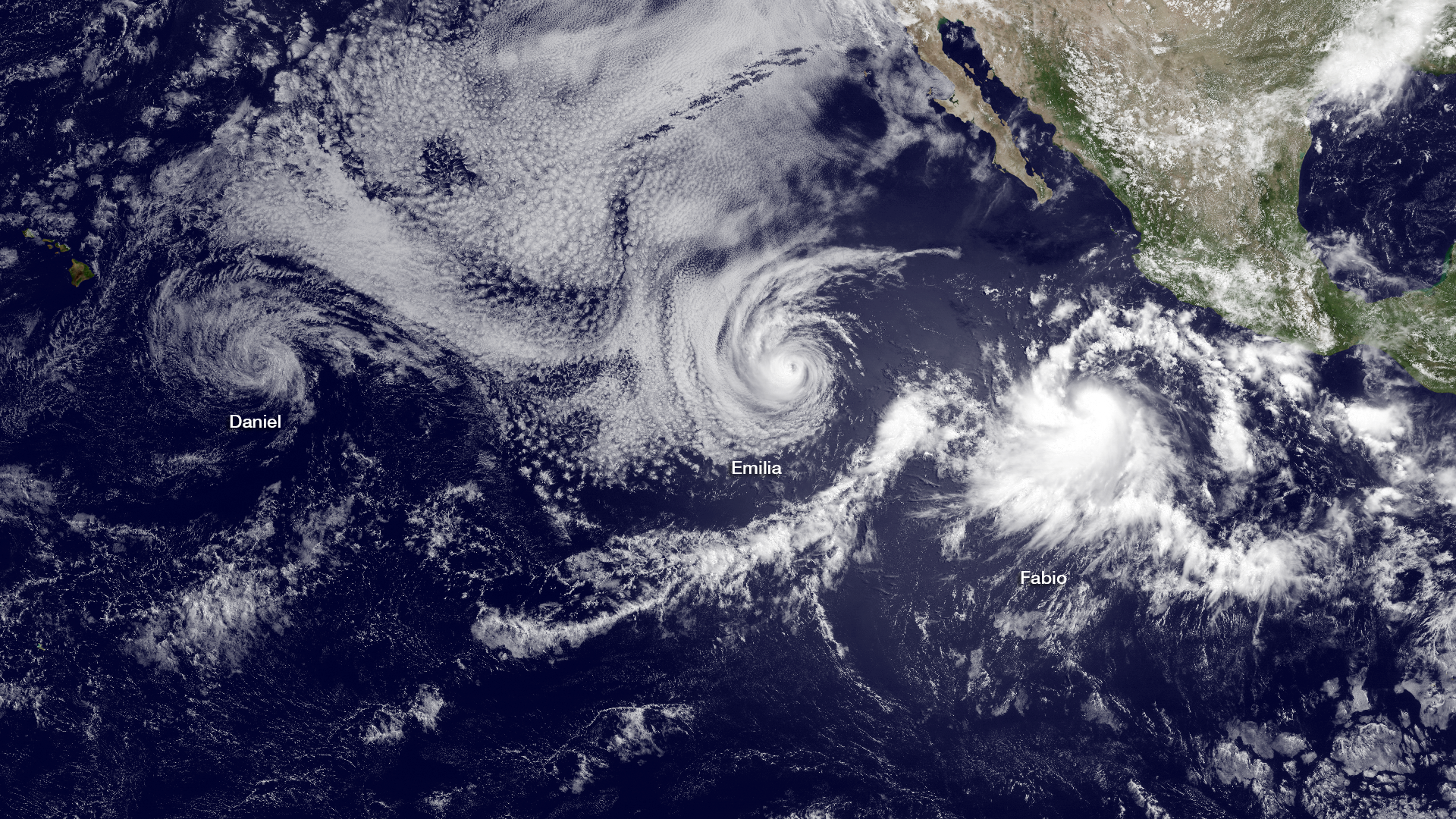
Three tropical cyclones active on July 12. From left to right: Daniel, Emilia and Fabio.

The season officially began on May 15 in the eastern Pacific and June 1 in the central Pacific; both ended on November 30. The season began with the formation of Tropical Storm Aletta on May 14, one day before the official start of the hurricane season in the eastern Pacific. On May 20, the second named storm of the season, Hurricane Bud, formed. It intensified to a Category 3 hurricane on the Saffir–Simpson hurricane wind scale, the first major hurricane of the season and also the third major occurrence of such. In June, Hurricane Carlotta intensified into a Category 2 hurricane. Carlotta made landfall as a Category 2 hurricane in southwestern Mexico, causing general damage. Carlotta killed seven people in Mexico and caused an estimated $12.4 million in damage (2012 USD). In July, three tropical cyclones formed, two of which were major hurricanes. Hurricane Emilia intensified as a Category 4 hurricane, becoming the most intense hurricane of the 2012 season. With the formation of Hurricane Fabio on July 12, the season was a month ahead of normal.

In August, three tropical cyclones formed, with two of them becoming hurricanes, Gilma and Ileana. September was the busiest month of the season, with the formation of five named storms, two of which were hurricanes. Hurricane Miriam, formed on September 22, became the fourth major hurricane of the season. In October, three named storms formed, one of which became the fifth and last major hurricane of the season. Hurricane Paul formed on October 13 and caused damage in the Baja California Peninsula. No deaths were reported from the hurricane, and the estimated total damage was $15.5 million (2012 USD). The season concluded with the formation of Tropical Storm Rosa on October 30. It dissipated on November 3 without affecting land. Storm activity in the Central Pacific Hurricane Center's area of responsibility was below average, with no tropical cyclones forming in the region. However, one tropical cyclone, Hurricane Daniel, entered the Central Pacific, as a tropical storm. The accumulated cyclone energy (ACE) index for the 2012 Pacific hurricane season as calculated by Colorado State University using data from the National Hurricane Center was 98.5 units. (Note: The total represents the sum of the squares of the maximum sustained wind speed (knots) for every (sub)tropical storm's intensity of over 33 knots (38 mph; 61 km/h), divided by 10,000 while they are above that threshold; therefore, tropical depressions are not included.)

== Systems ==
=== Tropical Storm Aletta ===
- Tropical storm (SSHWS)
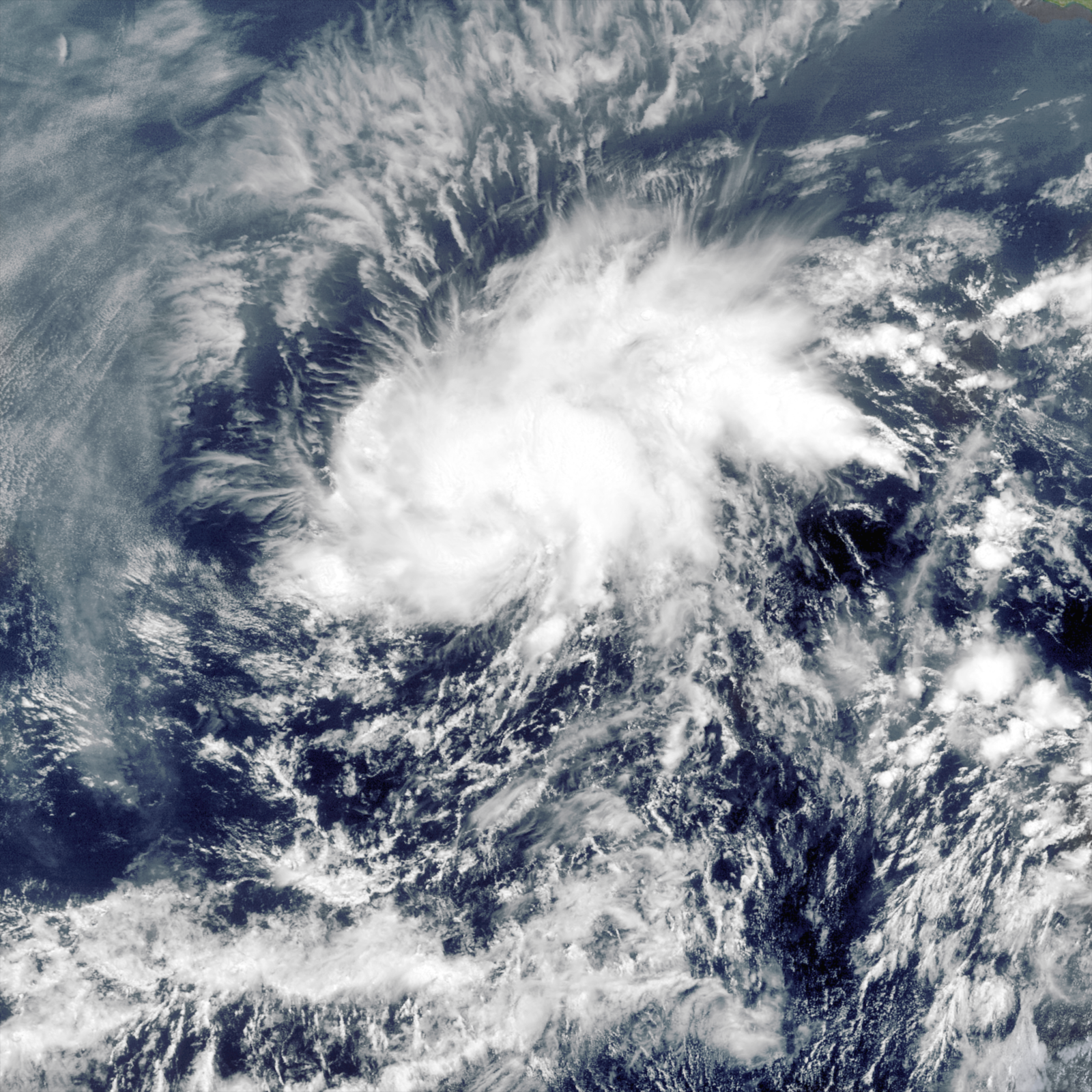
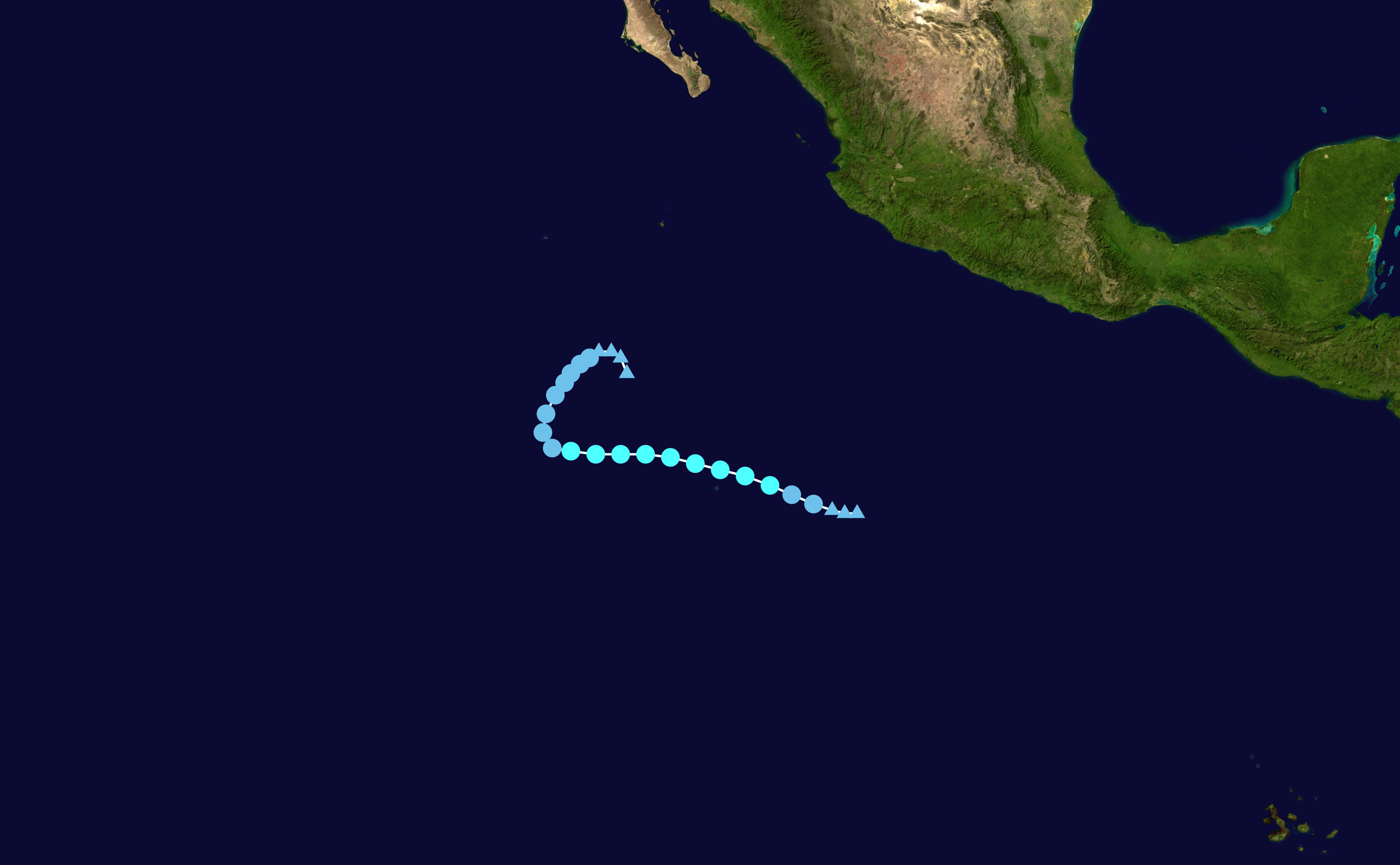
- Duration: May 14 – May 19
- Peak intensity: 50 mph (85 km/h) (1-min); 1000 mbar (hPa)

The passage of an eastward-moving kelvin wave generated a broad area of low pressure within the Intertropical Convergence Zone well south of Mexico on May 11. Convection organized about this low, leading to the season's first tropical depression around 12:00 UTC on May 14. A ridge extending from Mexico into the eastern Pacific forced the depression west, while low wind shear and warm ocean temperatures allowed it to become Tropical Storm Aletta by 00:00 UTC on May 15. After attaining peak winds of 50 mph (80 km/h) eighteen hours later, stronger upper-level winds and dry air caused a steady decay of the system. Aletta weakened to a tropical depression as it curved northeast early on May 17, and despite producing intermittent bursts of convection for a few days, ultimately degenerated to a remnant low around 06:00 UTC on May 19. The low turned southeast and dissipated the next day.

=== Hurricane Bud ===
- Category 3 hurricane (SSHWS)
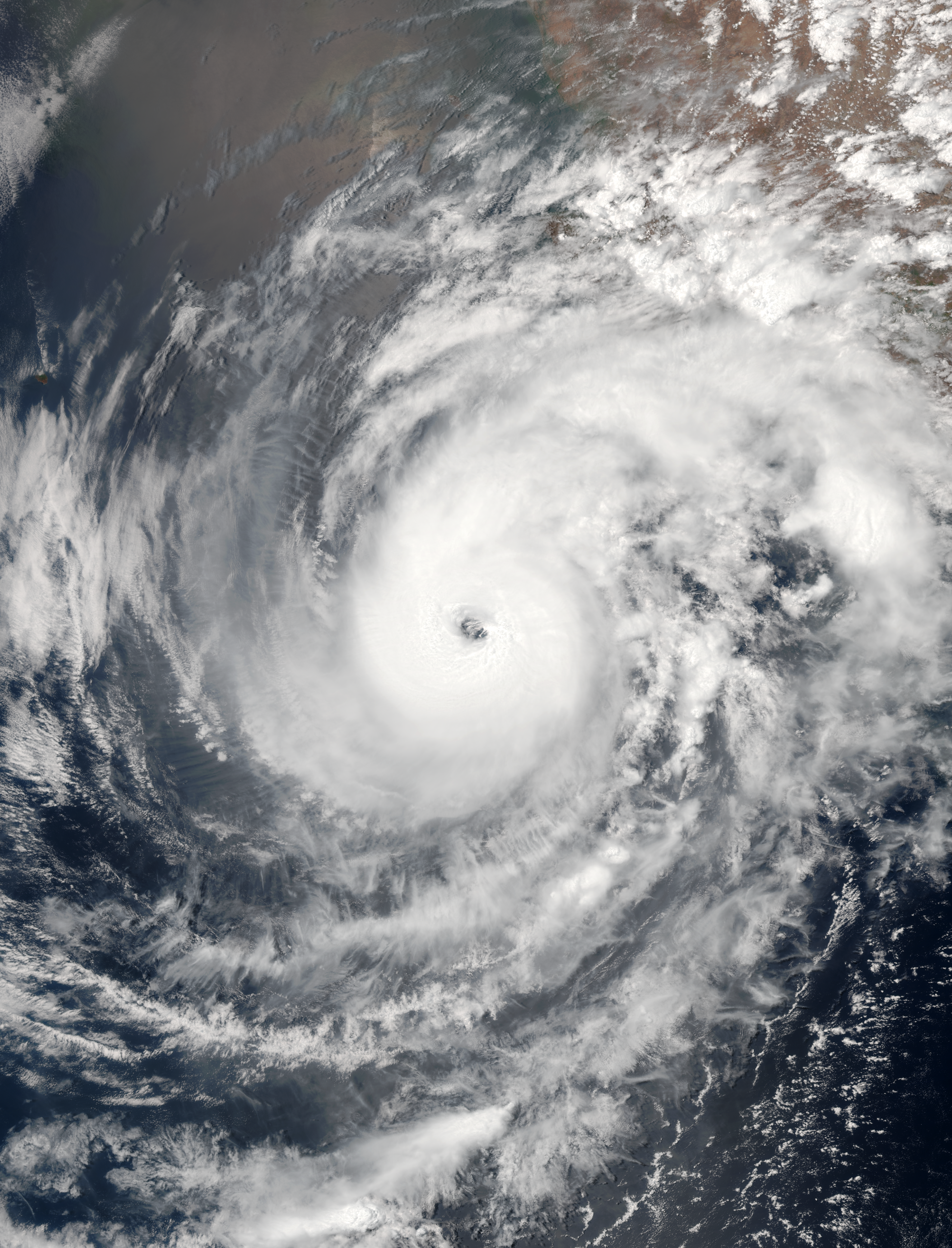
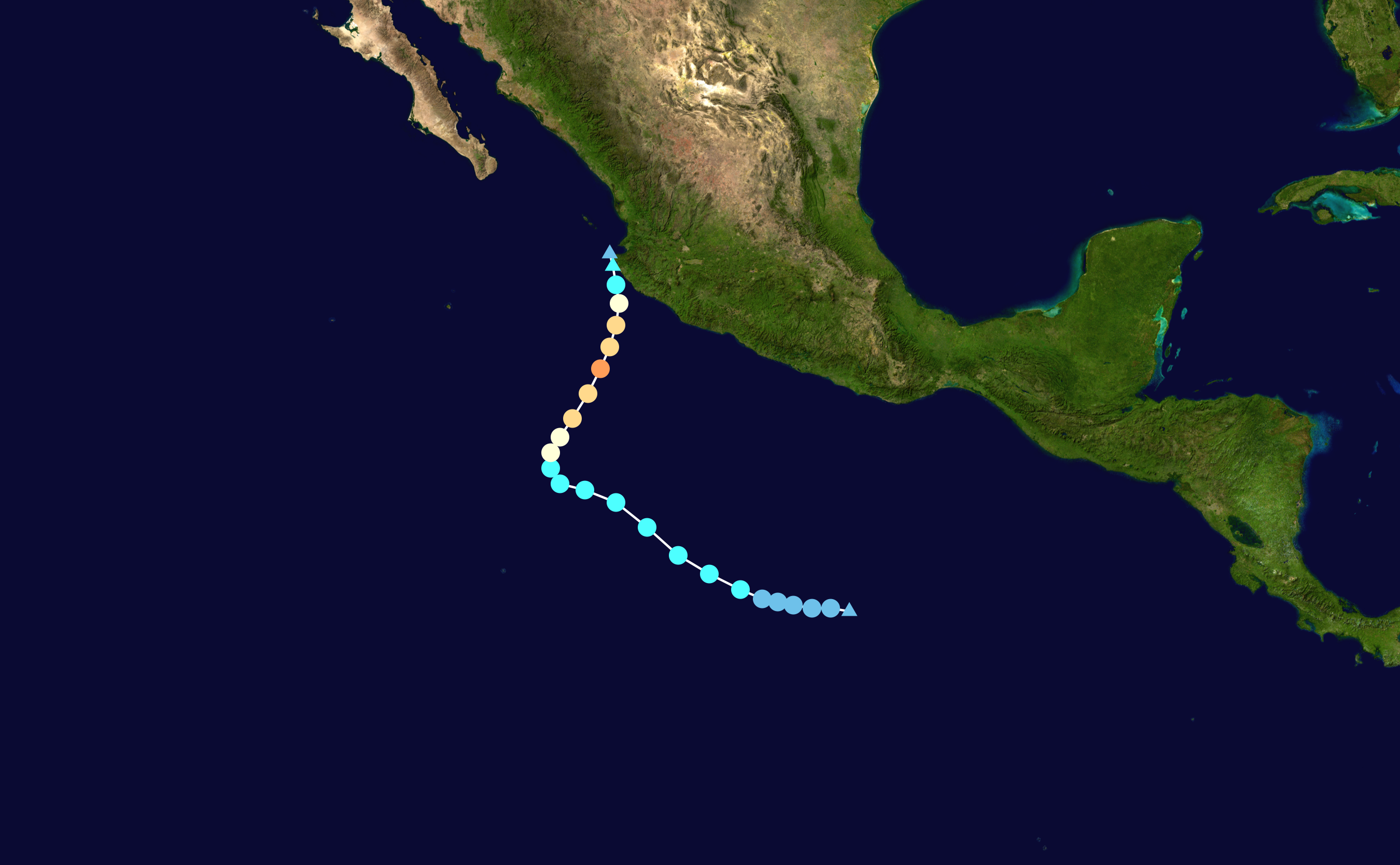
- Duration: May 20 – May 26
- Peak intensity: 115 mph (185 km/h) (1-min); 961 mbar (hPa)

A tropical wave that left Africa on May 5 organized into a tropical depression over the East Pacific around 18:00 UTC on May 20. Easterly wind shear prevented much organization, and the depression did not intensify into Tropical Storm Bud until 06:00 UTC on May 22. As the system moved west-northwest, upper-level winds gradually diminished, allowing Bud to attain hurricane strength by 00:00 UTC on May 24. A period of rapid intensification brought the system to its peak as a Category 3 hurricane with winds of 115 mph (185 km/h) within 24 hours, when it resembled an annular hurricane with a distinct eye and little outer banding. A trough over the southwestern United States directed the storm northeast, while increasing southwesterly wind shear prompted weakening. Bud fell to tropical storm intensity by 00:00 UTC on May 26 and degenerated to a remnant low six hours later. The remnants moved very close to the coastline of southwestern Mexico before dissipating on May 26.

=== Hurricane Carlotta ===
- Category 2 hurricane (SSHWS)
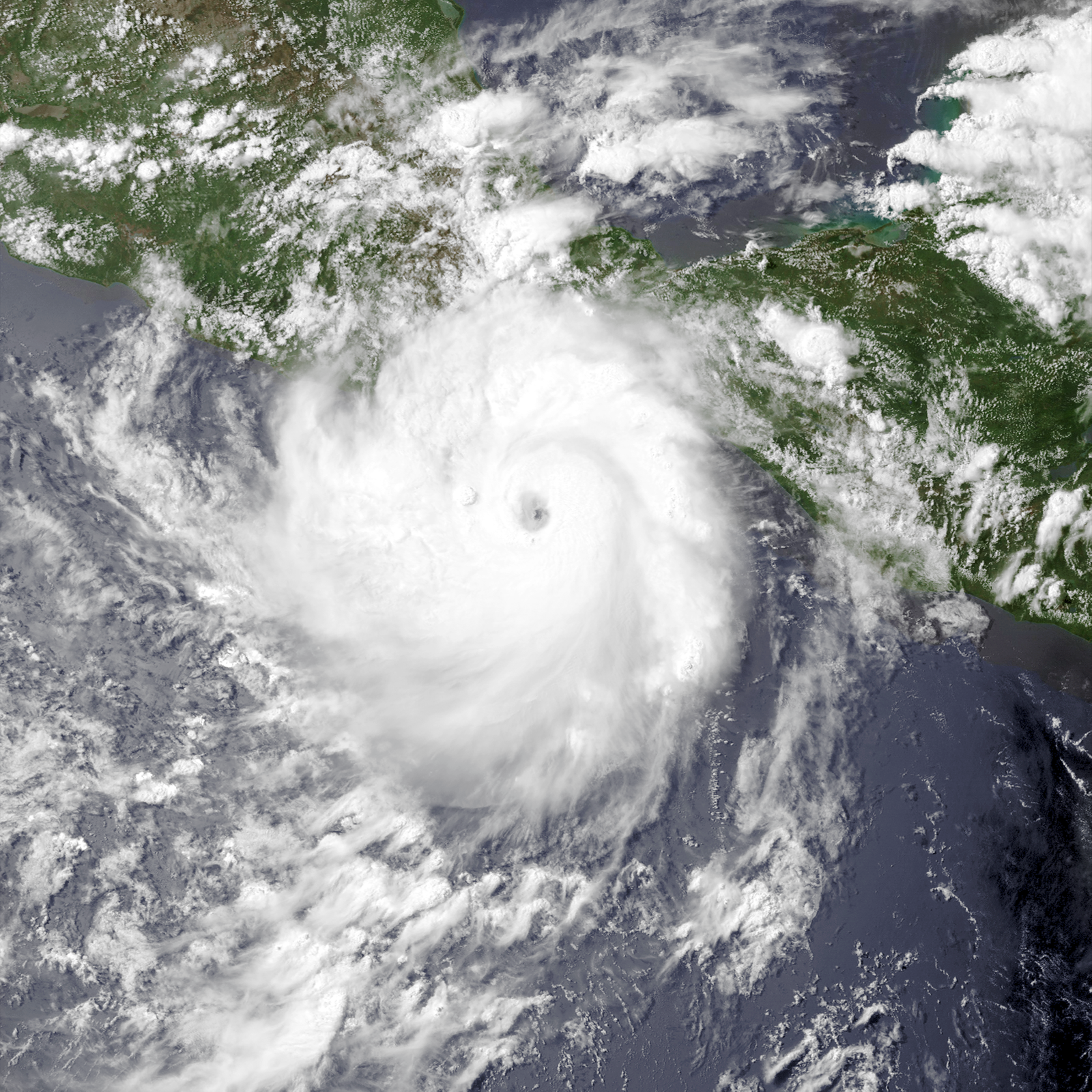
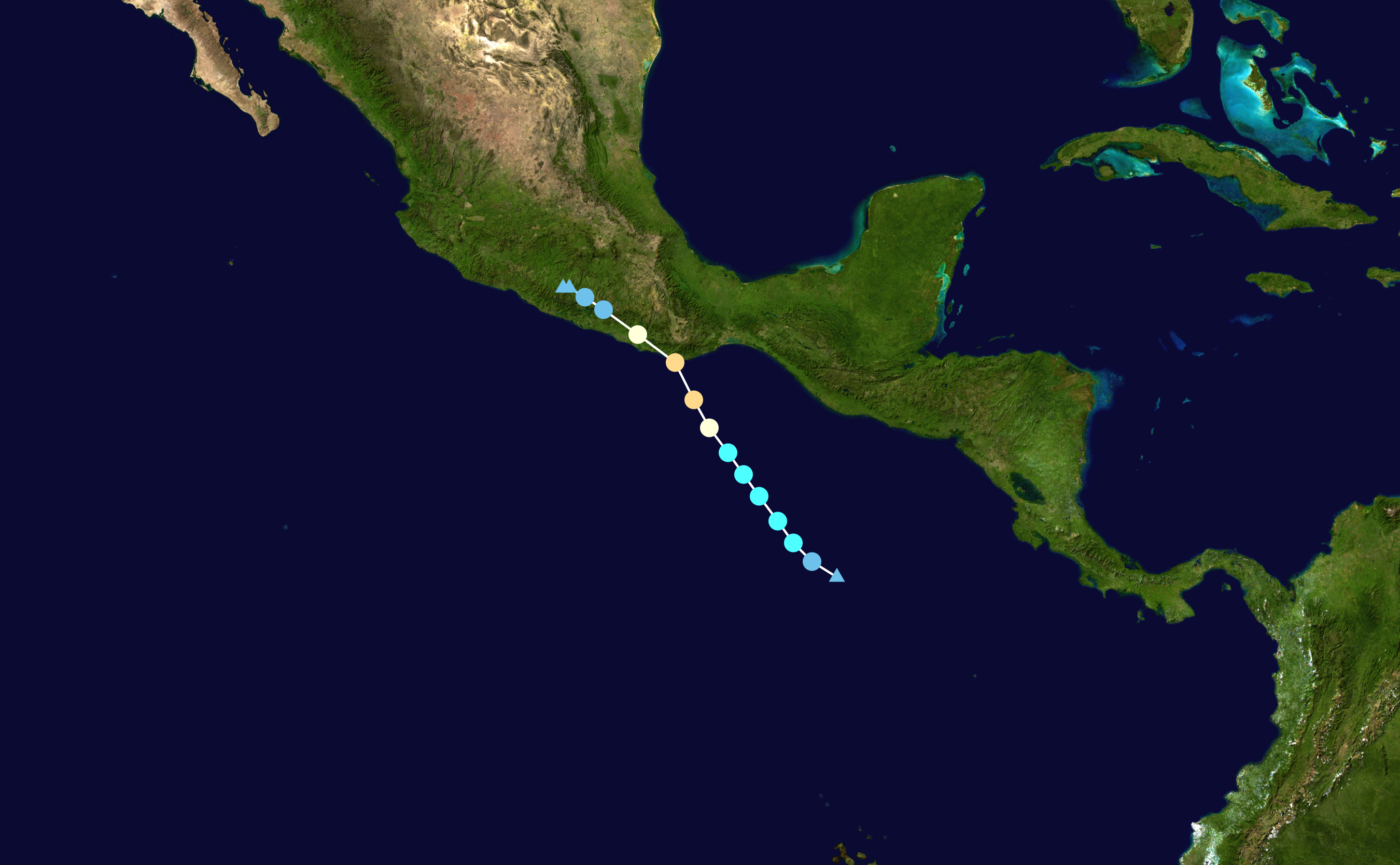
- Duration: June 14 – June 16
- Peak intensity: 110 mph (175 km/h) (1-min); 973 mbar (hPa)

An area of disturbed weather that may have originated as a tropical wave from Africa emerged into the East Pacific on June 11. Light wind shear and an eastward-moving kelvin wave aided in the development of a tropical depression by 00:00 UTC on June 14, and Tropical Storm Carlotta six hours later. As the storm moved northwest on the periphery of a mid-level ridge, it attained hurricane strength around 12:00 UTC on June 15 and rapidly intensified to its peak as a Category 2 with winds of 110 mph (175 km/h) by 21:00 UTC that day. Carlotta subsequently made landfall near Puerto Escondido, Mexico, at a slightly reduced strength, becoming the easternmost landfalling hurricane on record in the East Pacific. After the storm moved ashore, it rapidly weakened over the mountains terrain of southern Mexico, degenerating to a remnant low around 00:00 UTC on June 17 and dissipating over Guerrero twelve hours later.

Upon formation, hurricane watches were issued for the southern coastline of Mexico. This was later upgraded to a warning when Carlotta became a hurricane. The storm made landfall in southern Mexico, bringing with it heavy rains and gusty winds which caused flash floods and numerous landslides along the area, primarily the state of Oaxaca. Due to the severity of the situation in Oaxaca the governor requested for a state of emergency to be declared to his state. Throughout Mexico, seven people were killed by Carlotta and damage amounted to MX$1.4 billion (US$107.7 million).

=== Hurricane Daniel ===
- Category 3 hurricane (SSHWS)
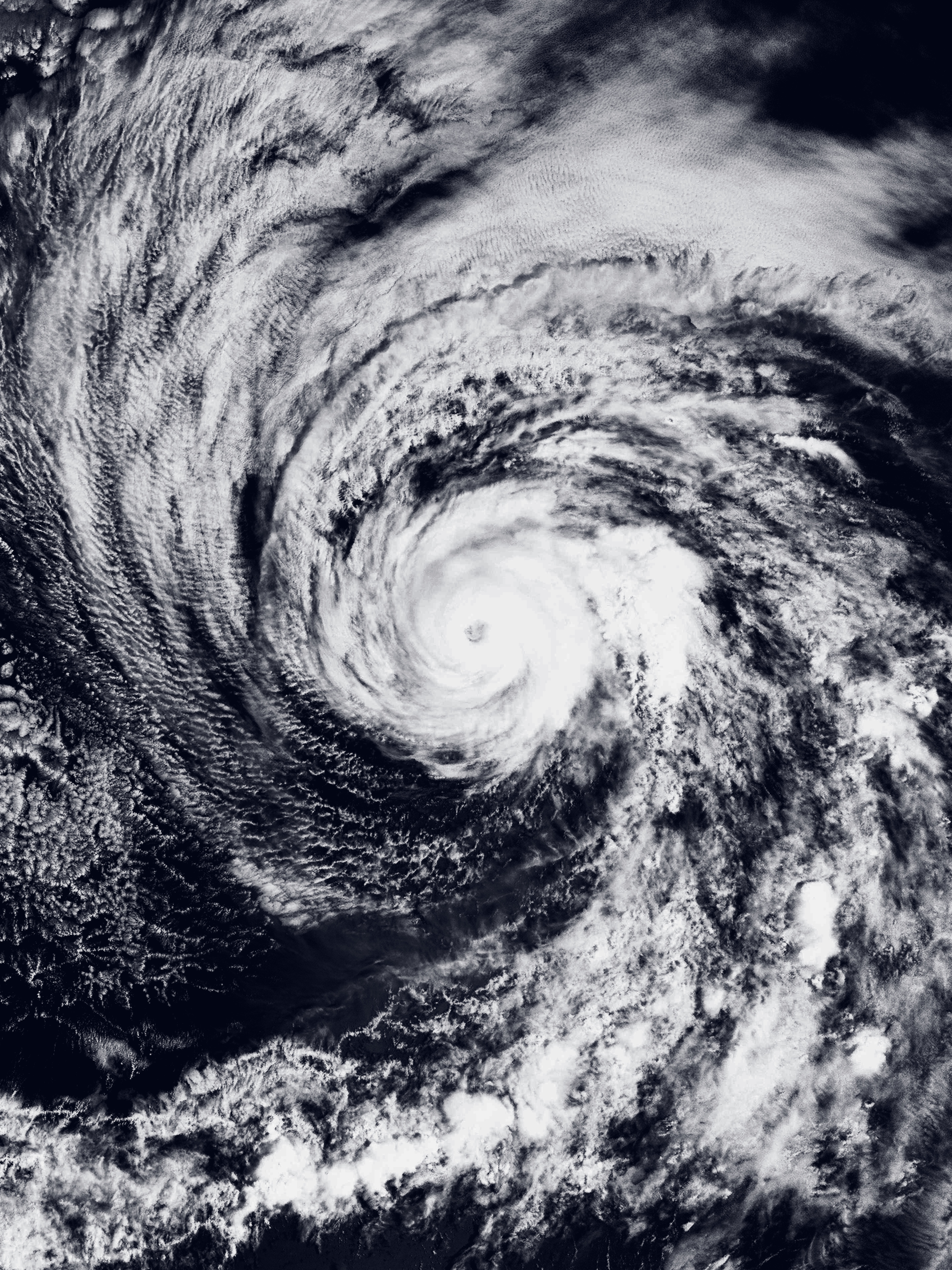
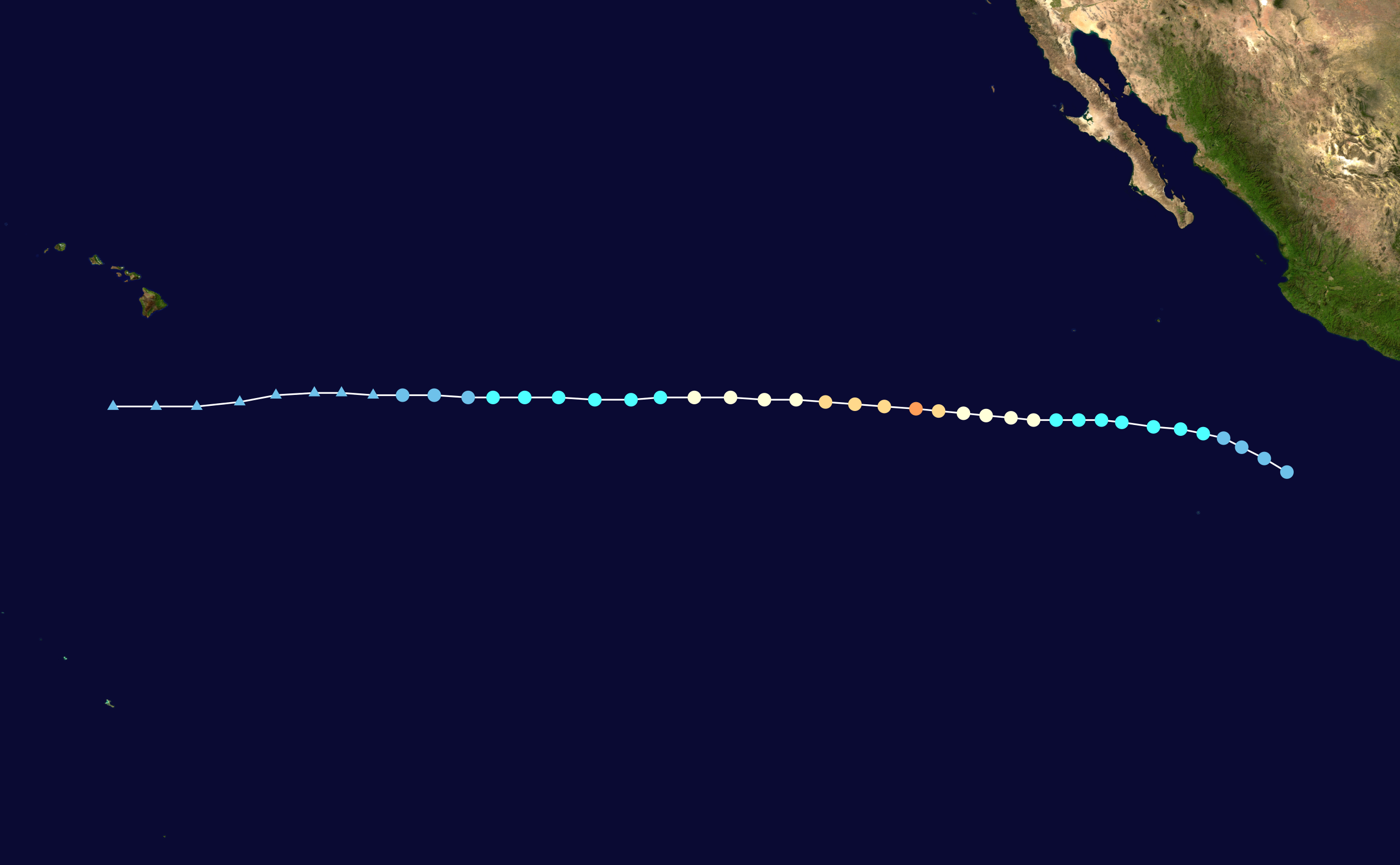
- Duration: July 4 – July 12
- Peak intensity: 115 mph (185 km/h) (1-min); 961 mbar (hPa)

A tropical wave emerged off Africa on June 20 and moved inconspicuously across the Atlantic, crossing Central America nine days later. The disturbance organized into a tropical depression around 06:00 UTC on July 4 and further strengthened into Tropical Storm Daniel after 24 hours. Moderate easterly wind shear affected the storm initially, but these winds relaxed and allowed Daniel to become a hurricane by 00:00 UTC on July 7 when an eye became apparent on satellite. Steady intensification brought the storm to its peak as a Category 3 with winds of 115 mph (185 km/h) around 06:00 UTC on July 8. A westward track into cooler waters and drier air caused Daniel to begin slowly; it fell to tropical storm strength by 06:00 UTC on July 10, weakened to a tropical depression around 18:00 UTC on July 11 shortly after crossing into the Central Pacific, and subsequently degenerated to a remnant low by 12:00 UTC on July 12. The low opened up into a trough early on July 14.

=== Hurricane Emilia ===
- Category 4 hurricane (SSHWS)
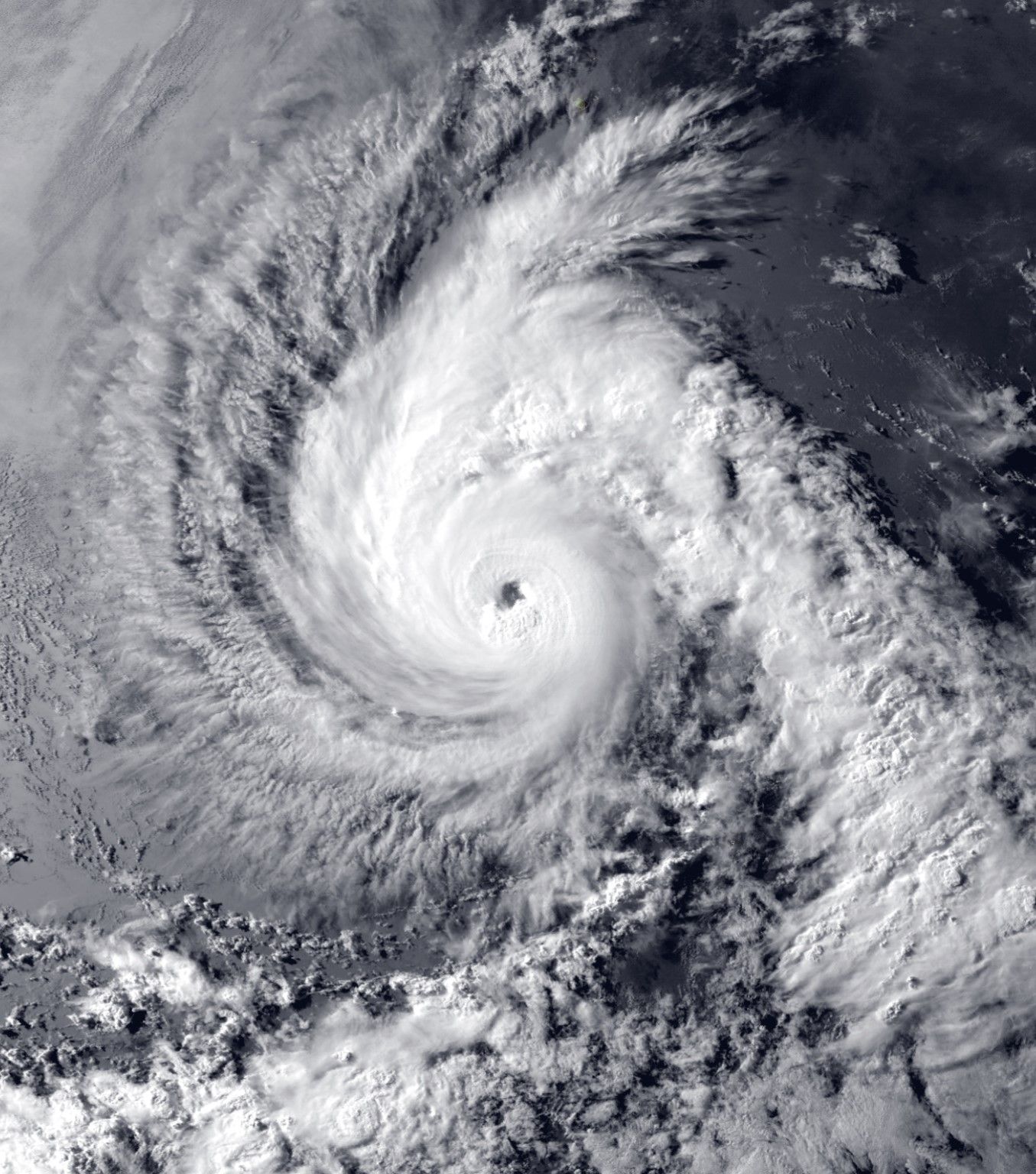
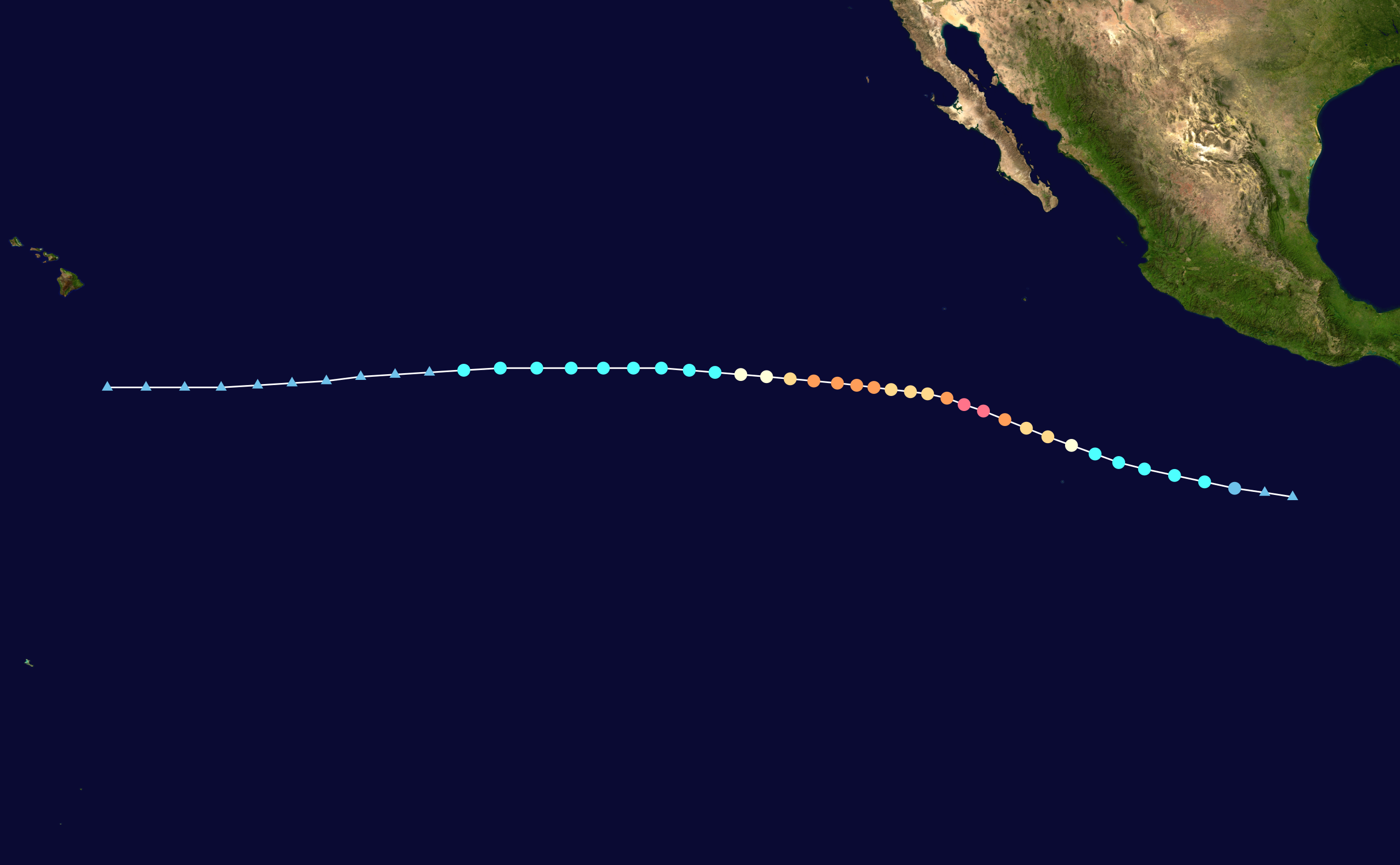
- Duration: July 7 – July 15
- Peak intensity: 140 mph (220 km/h) (1-min); 945 mbar (hPa)

A quick-moving tropical wave left Africa on June 23 and emerged into the East Pacific late on July 4, where it interacted with a disturbance within the ITCZ. The two systems coalesced, leading to the formation of a tropical depression by 18:00 UTC on July 7, and to Tropical Storm Emilia six hours later. A mid-level ridge extending west from Mexico directed the cyclone west-northwest, while a favorable environment allowed Emilia to intensify. It attained hurricane strength around 06:00 UTC on July 9 with the formation of a banded eye, and further strengthened to a Category 4 with winds of 140 mph (225 km/h) a day later when its eye was embedded within very deep convection. The onset of an eyewall replacement cycle caused Emilia to weaken to a Category 2 hurricane early on July 11, but it regained Category 3 intensity later that day before entering cooler waters and a drier environment. Emilia weakened to a tropical storm around 12:00 UTC on July 13 and degenerated to a remnant low by 18:00 UTC on July 15. The post-tropical cyclone continued west and opened into a trough south of Hawaii early on July 18.

=== Hurricane Fabio ===
- Category 2 hurricane (SSHWS)
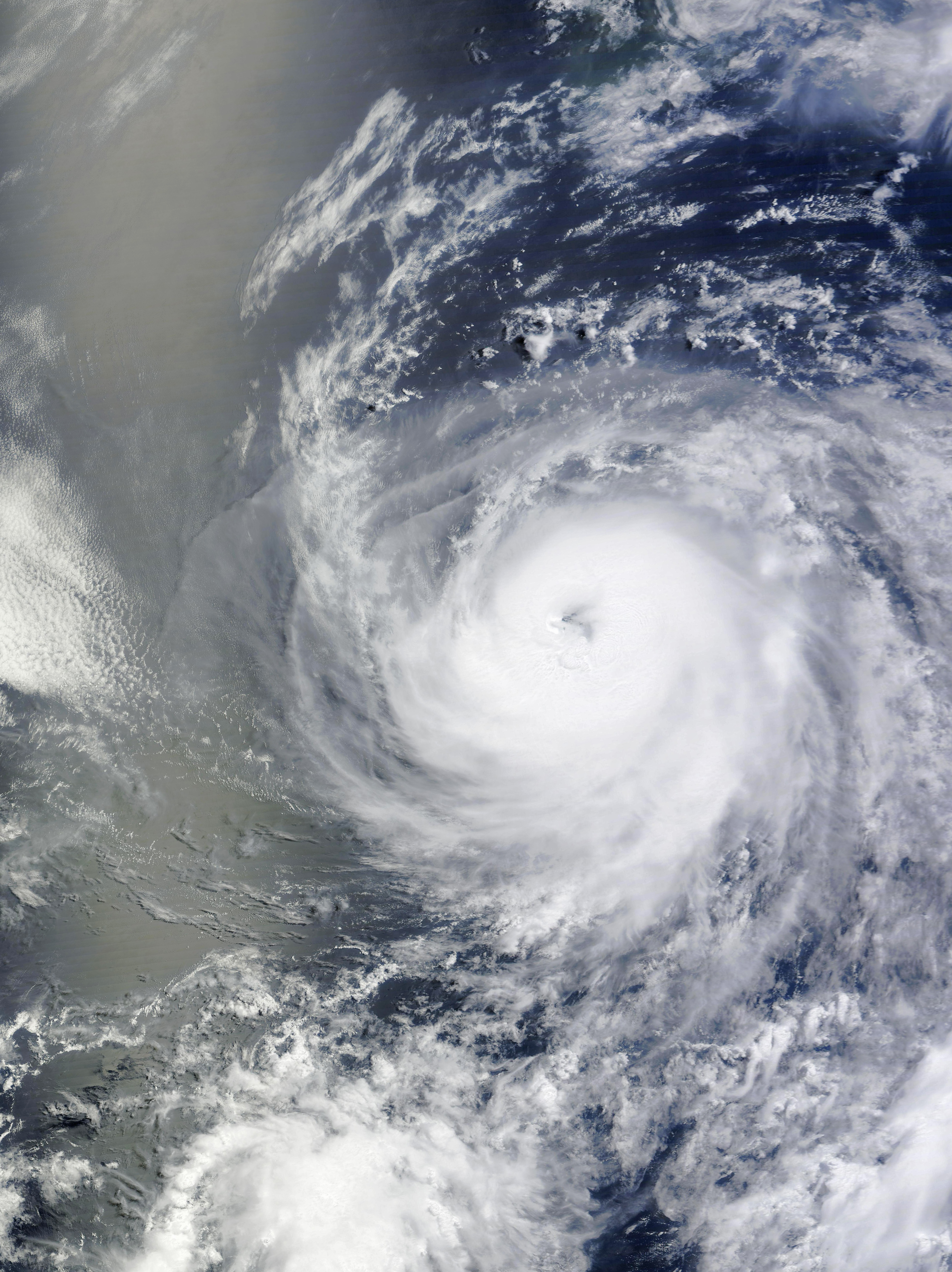
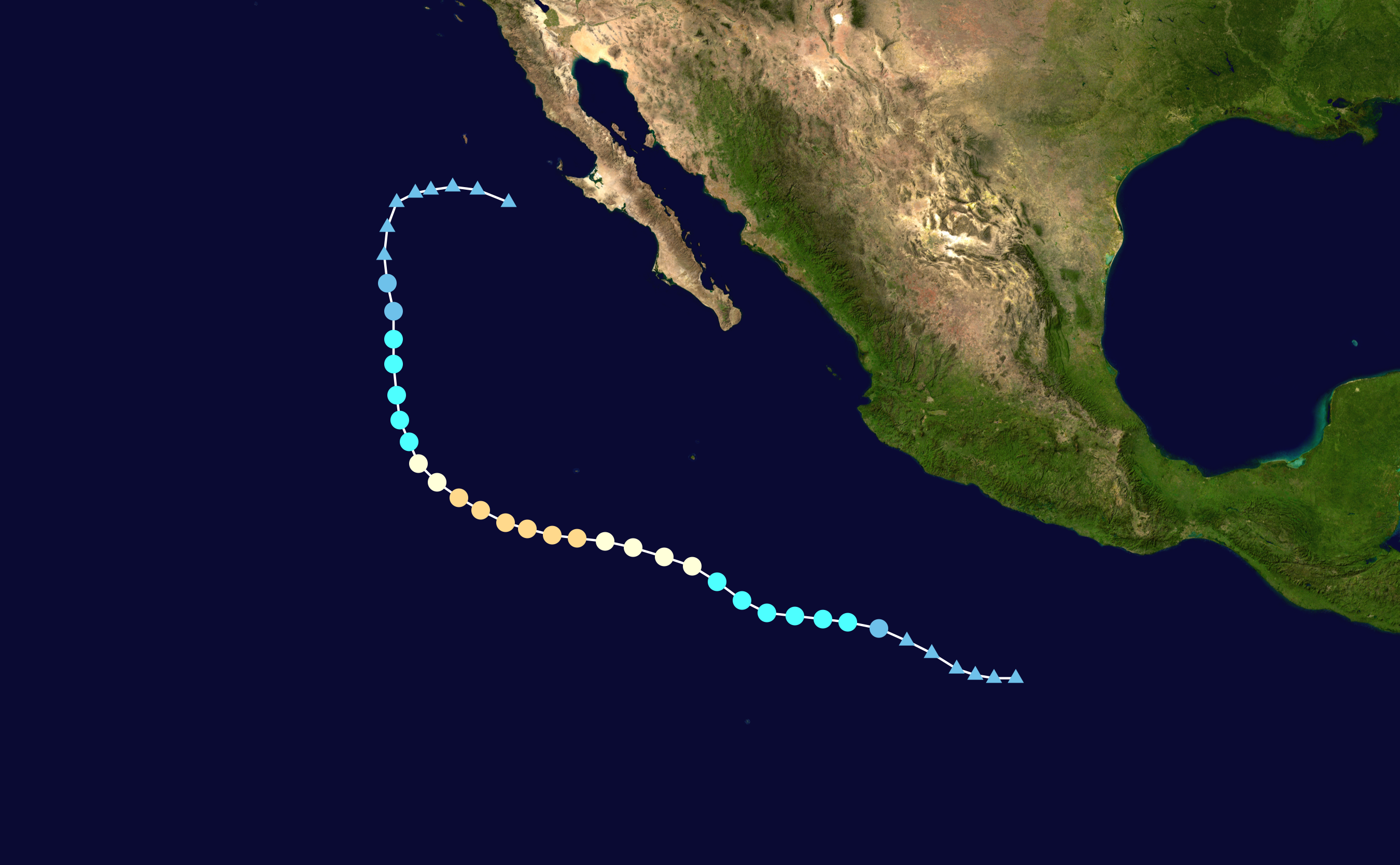
- Duration: July 12 – July 18
- Peak intensity: 110 mph (175 km/h) (1-min); 966 mbar (hPa)

On June 27, a tropical wave left Africa; it tracked west, emerging into the East Pacific on July 7. Interaction with a series of eastward-moving kelvin waves led to the formation of a tropical depression around 00:00 UTC on July 12; six hours later, it became Tropical Storm Fabio. The storm moved west amid modest wind shear, becoming a hurricane by 18:00 UTC on July 13 and gradually strengthening to a Category 2 with winds of 110 mph (175 km/h) around 06:00 UTC on July 15. At its best, the hurricane was characterized by a distinct eye within deep convection, and it was possible Fabio briefly attained major hurricane strength. The system turned northwest and then north into cooler waters after peak, weakening to a tropical storm late on July 16, to a tropical depression early on July 18, and finally to a remnant low around 12:00 UTC that morning. The low curved east-southeast before dissipating on July 20.

=== Hurricane Gilma ===
- Category 1 hurricane (SSHWS)
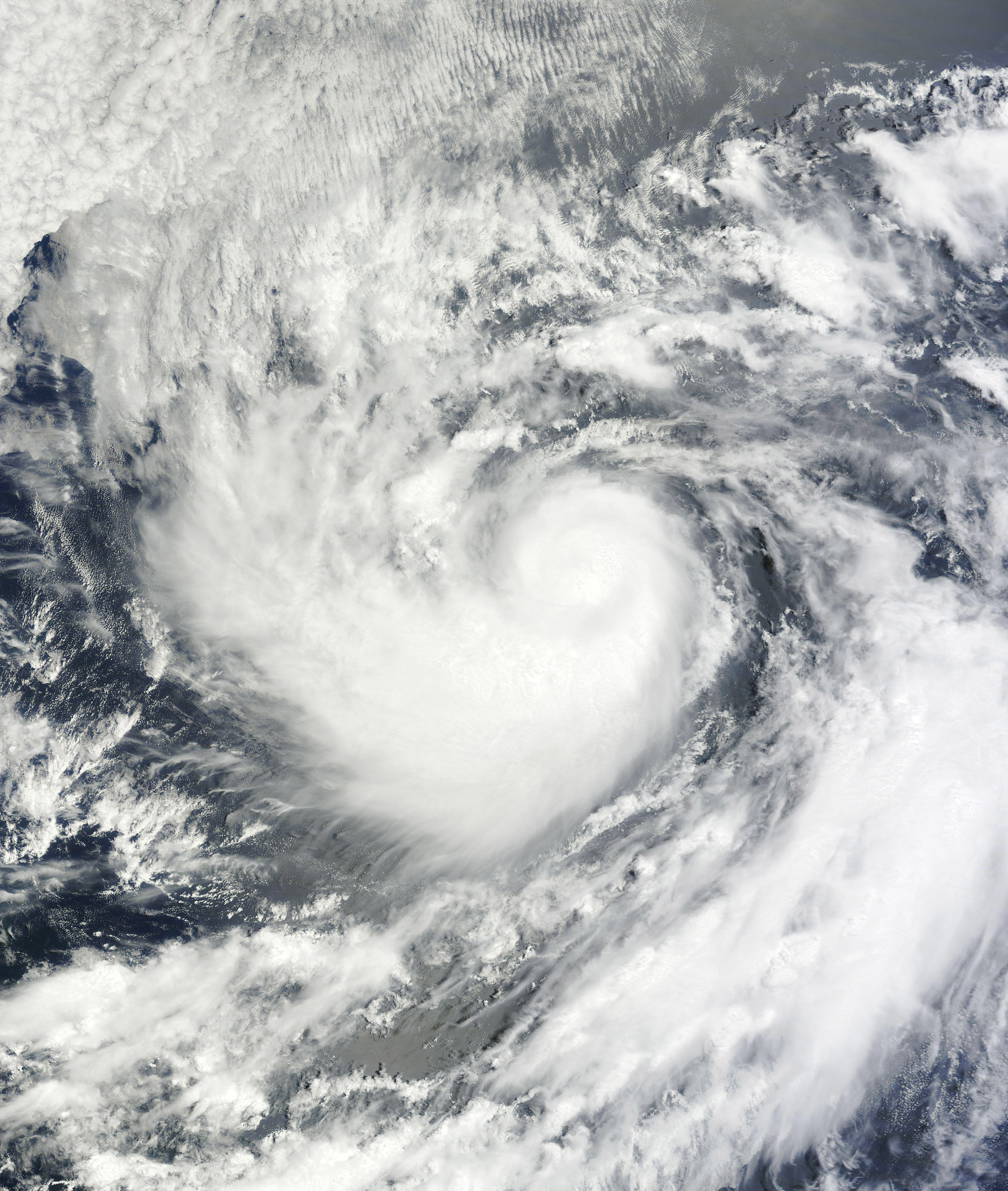
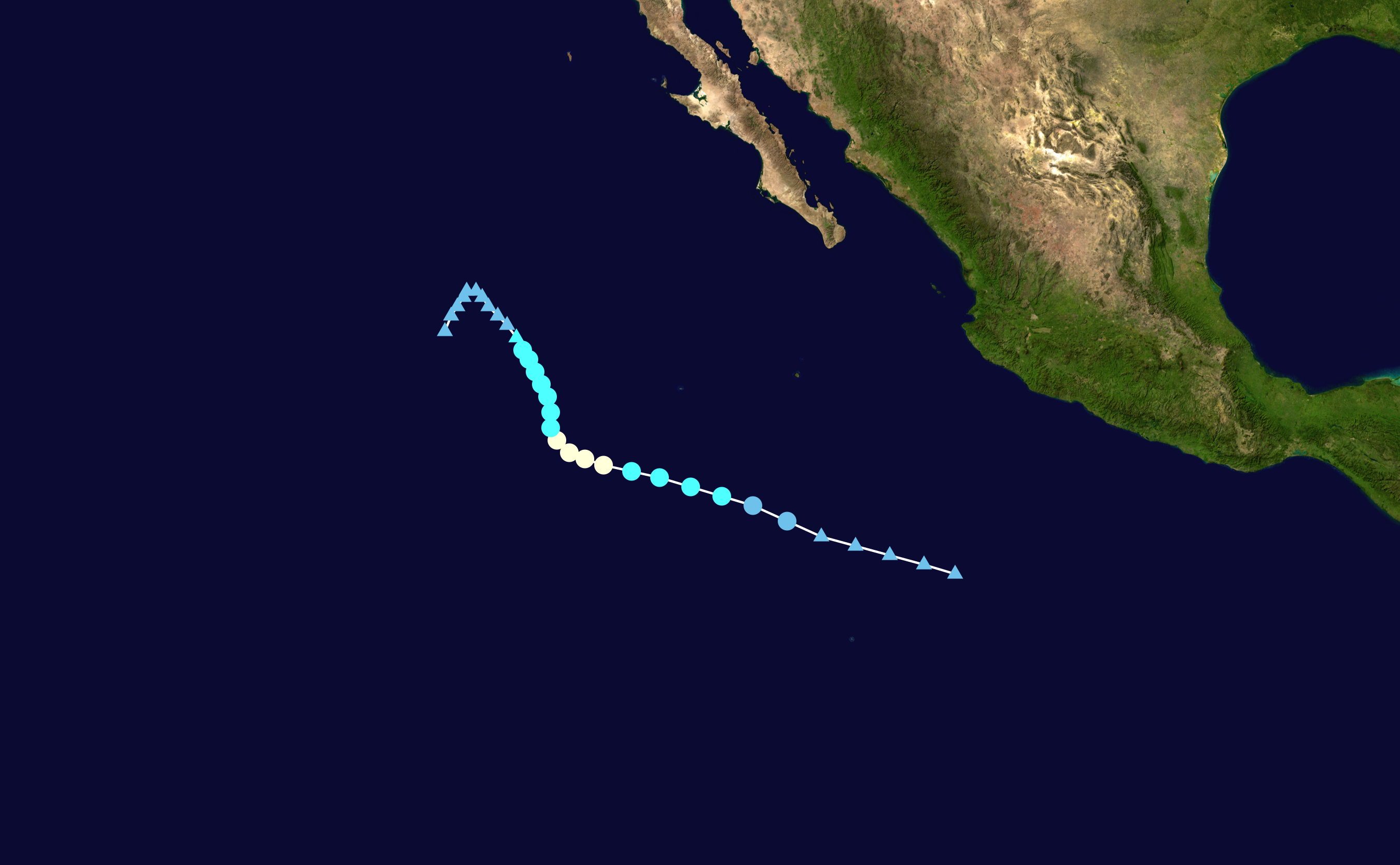
- Duration: August 7 – August 11
- Peak intensity: 80 mph (130 km/h) (1-min); 984 mbar (hPa)

A tropical wave departed Africa on July 27. Hampered by strong upper-level winds across the central Atlantic, it entered the East Pacific on August 2, where interaction with a kelvin wave led to an uptick in convection. Further organization ensued and a tropical depression formed around 06:00 UTC on August 7; the depression intensified into Tropical Storm Gilma twelve hours later. On a west-northwest heading, the newly formed system intensified within a favorable environment, attaining hurricane strength by 18:00 UTC on August 8 and reaching peak winds of 80 mph (130 km/h) several hours later. Increasing wind shear and decreasing ocean temperatures weakened Gilma beginning on August 9; it fell to tropical storm status around 18:00 UTC that day and gradually degenerated to a remnant area of low pressure by 12:00 UTC on August 11. The low turned southwest before dissipating well away from land on August 14.

=== Tropical Storm Hector ===
- Tropical storm (SSHWS)
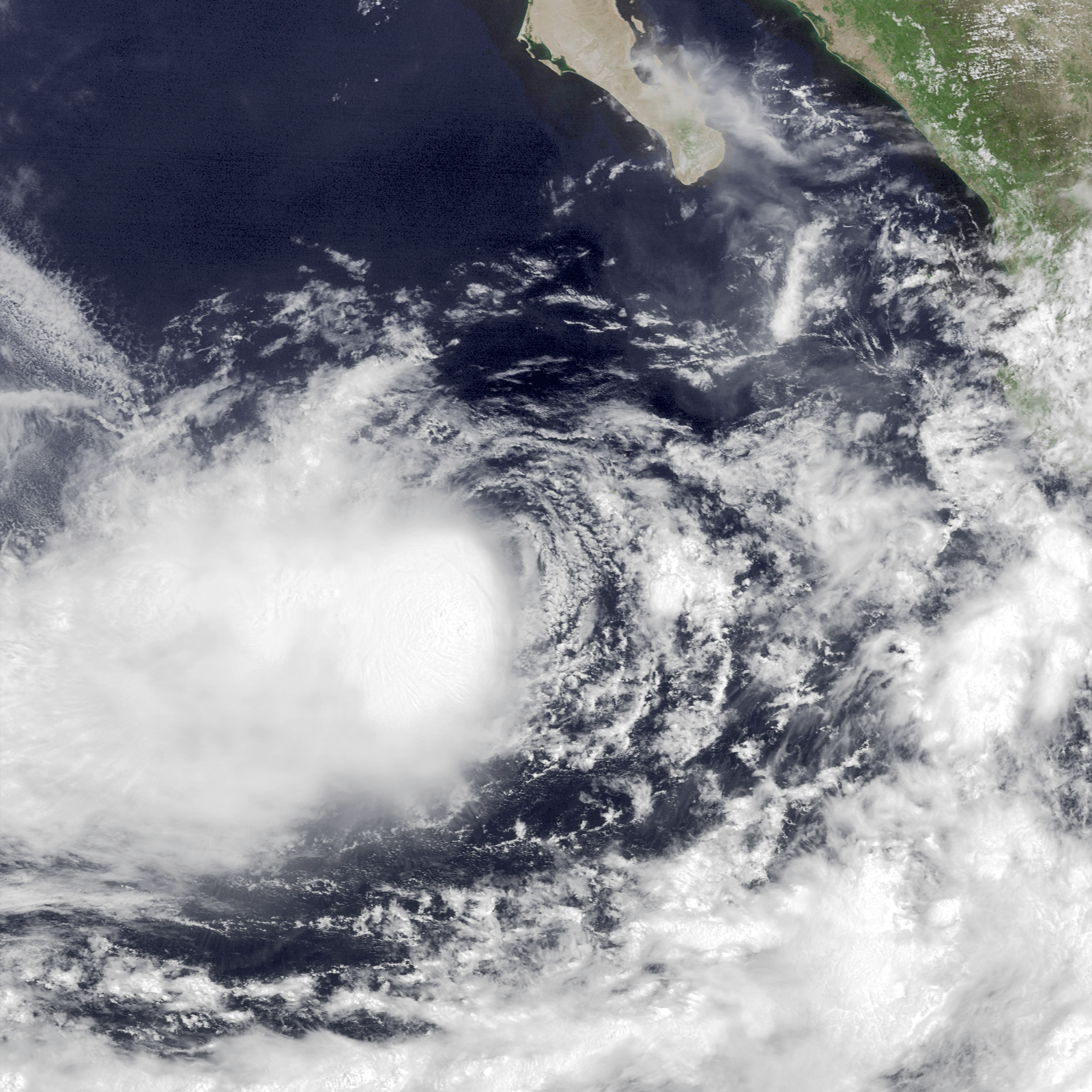
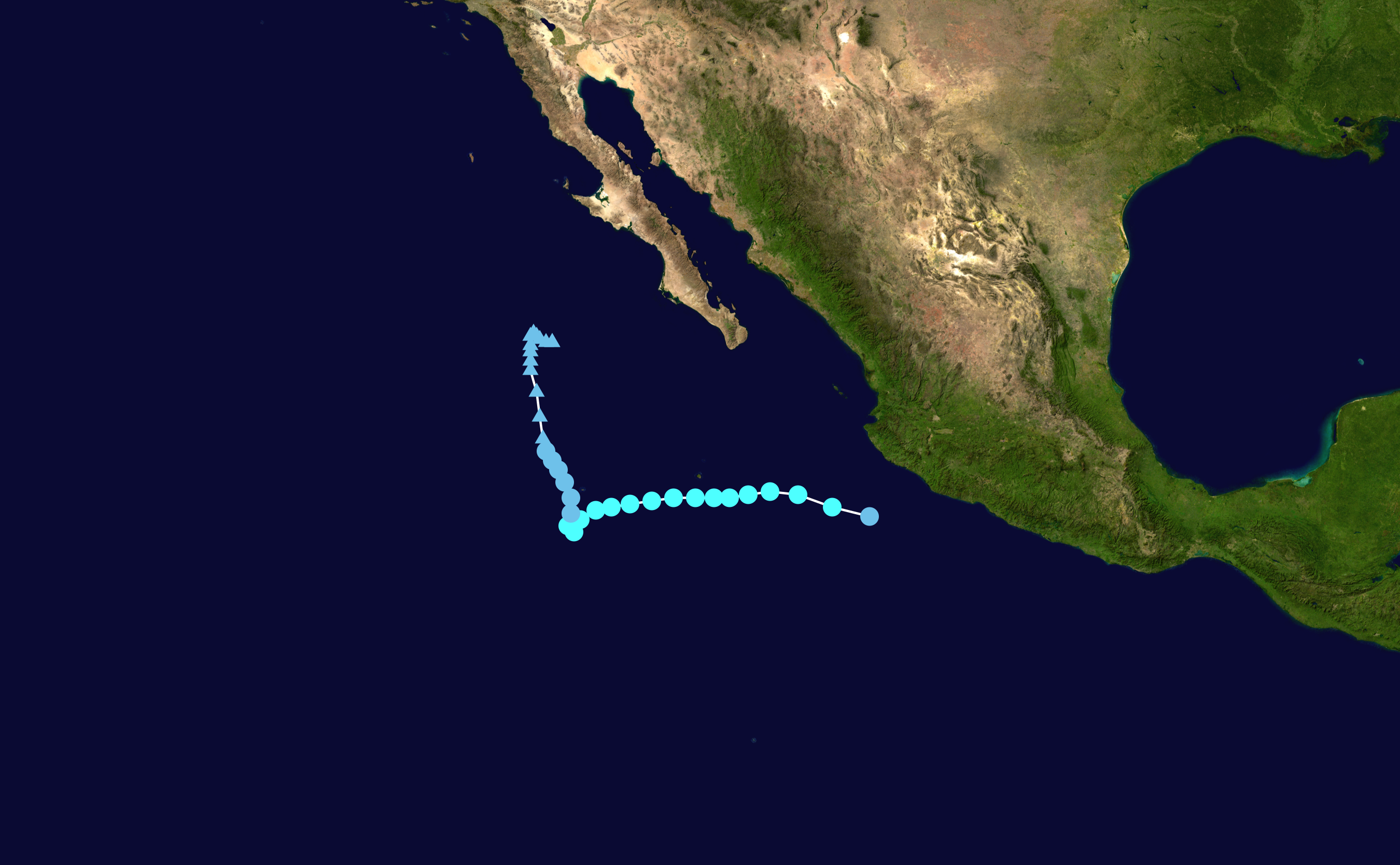
- Duration: August 11 – August 16
- Peak intensity: 50 mph (85 km/h) (1-min); 995 mbar (hPa)

A trough of low pressure, formed from the remnants of Hurricane Ernesto in the Atlantic, began to organize, and by the evening hours of August 11, the NHC declared the formation of Tropical Depression Eight-E. The next day, the depression intensified to Tropical Storm Hector, the eighth named storm of the 2012 season. Hector moved slowly towards the west, with slight changes in strength during its entirety. Because of the strong vertical wind shear and marginally warm water around Hector, not much strengthening was anticipated, but instead weakened over the next several days. It never intensified above tropical storm strength, where it remained until further weakening to a tropical depression on August 15. The next day on August 16, as Hector lacked numerous thunderstorms surrounding its center, it was declared post-tropical. During the next several days, Hector slowly curved towards the east, before dissipating on August 20.

Hector brought waves up to 12 ft (3.7 m) in the port of Mazatlán, subsequently; authorities restricted boating access. The storm also brought intervals of heavy showers, gusty winds exceeding 40 mph and hot temperatures in most municipalities in Sinaloa. 400 people were evacuated in Los Cabos due to flooding. 100 people were left homeless.

=== Hurricane Ileana ===
- Category 1 hurricane (SSHWS)
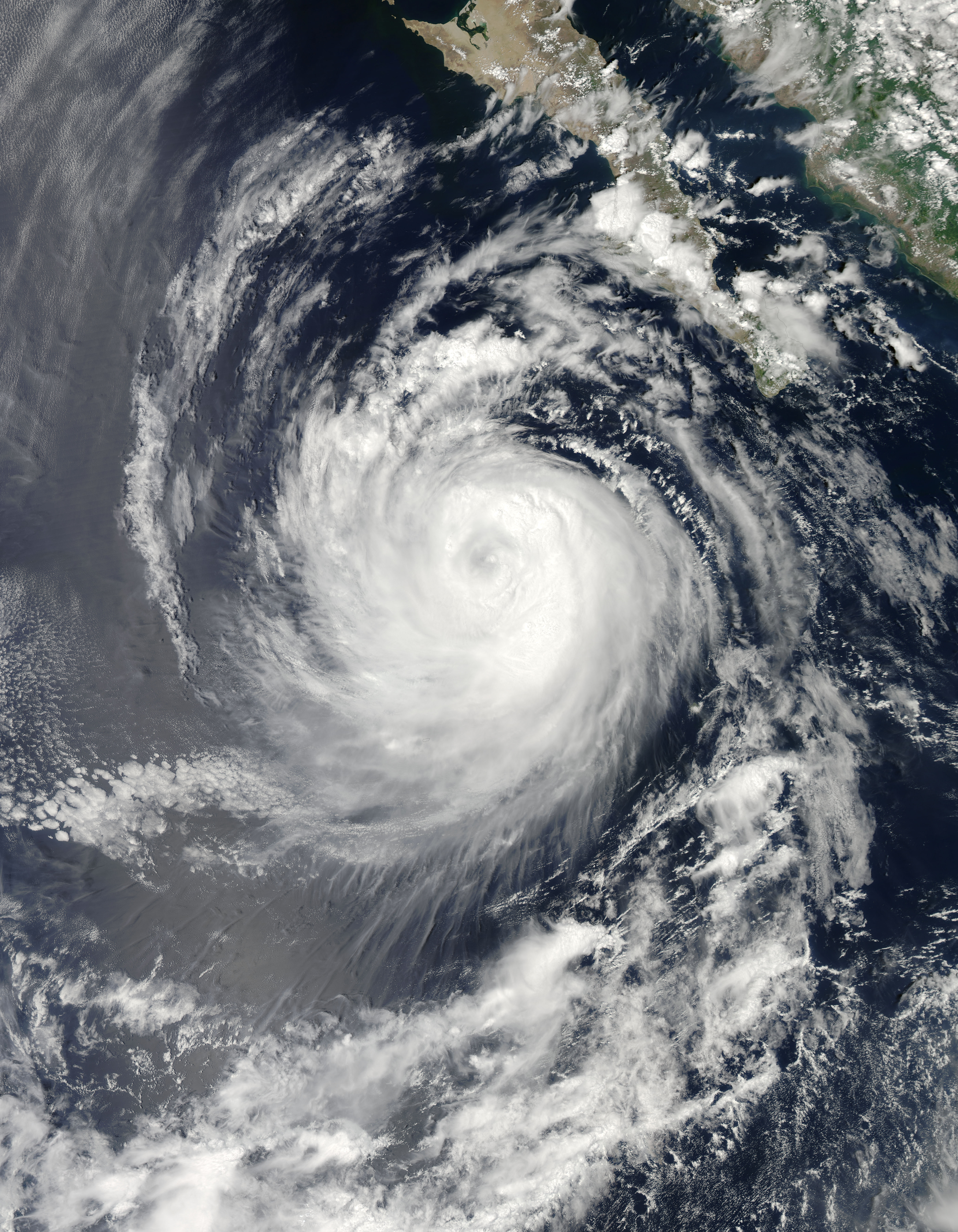
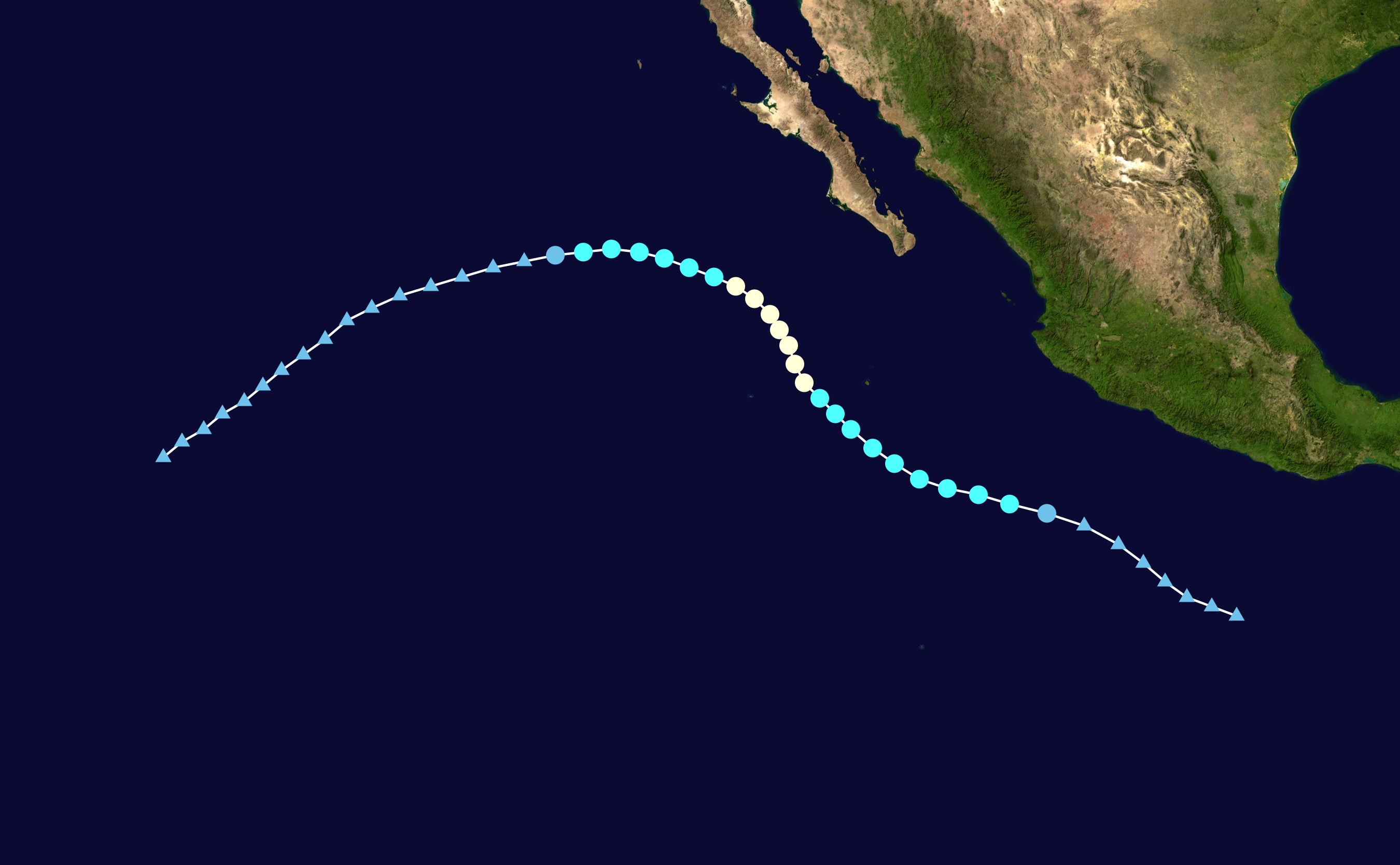
- Duration: August 27 – September 2
- Peak intensity: 85 mph (140 km/h) (1-min); 978 mbar (hPa)

The low-pressure system that was to become Hurricane Ileana began from a tropical wave that is first monitored by the National Hurricane Center on August 23. Development of the said wave is expected if it reaches more favorable conditions. Moving towards the north-west, the low began to organize, and by August 27, the low organized to become the ninth tropical depression of the season. The depression continued to show signs of organization, and later that day it was upgraded to Tropical Storm Ileana, the ninth named storm of the season. Ileana took advantage of the warm sea surface temperature and low vertical wind shear and became better organized; such substantial strengthening would make Ileana a hurricane, peaking as an 85 mph (135 km/h) Category 1 hurricane on August 29. Ileana would not maintain hurricane strength for long, and, as predicted, weakened back to tropical storm status on August 31 as it began to turn west. Weakening continued as Ileana traversed cooler sea surface temperatures and encountered increasing wind shear and more stable air environment. The storm weakened to a tropical depression on September 2 and further weakened into a post-tropical cyclone after failing to sustain deep convection for over twelve hours. However, the remnants continued moving southwestward into the Central Pacific over the next 4 days, before finally dissipating on September 6.

=== Tropical Storm John ===
- Tropical storm (SSHWS)
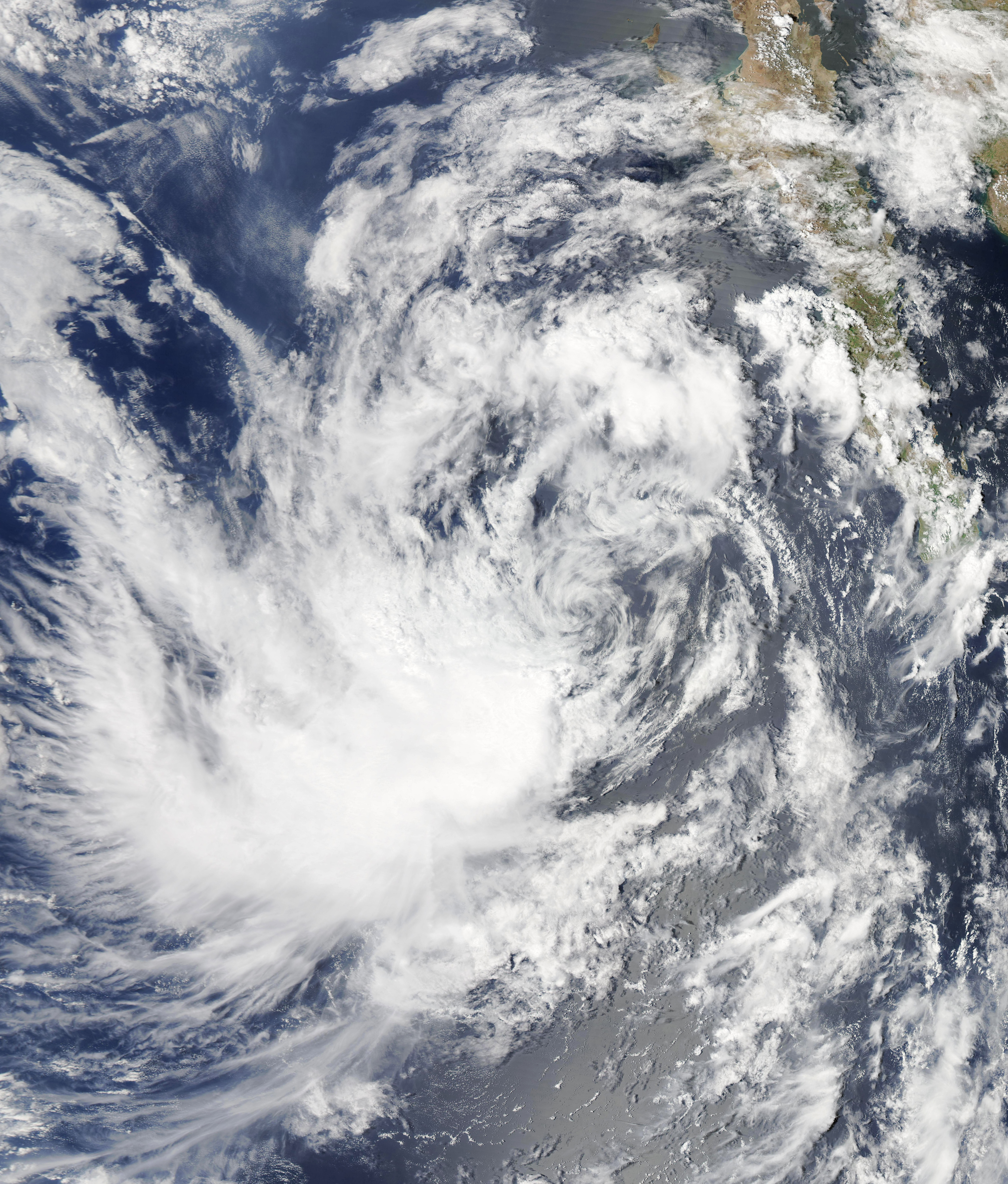
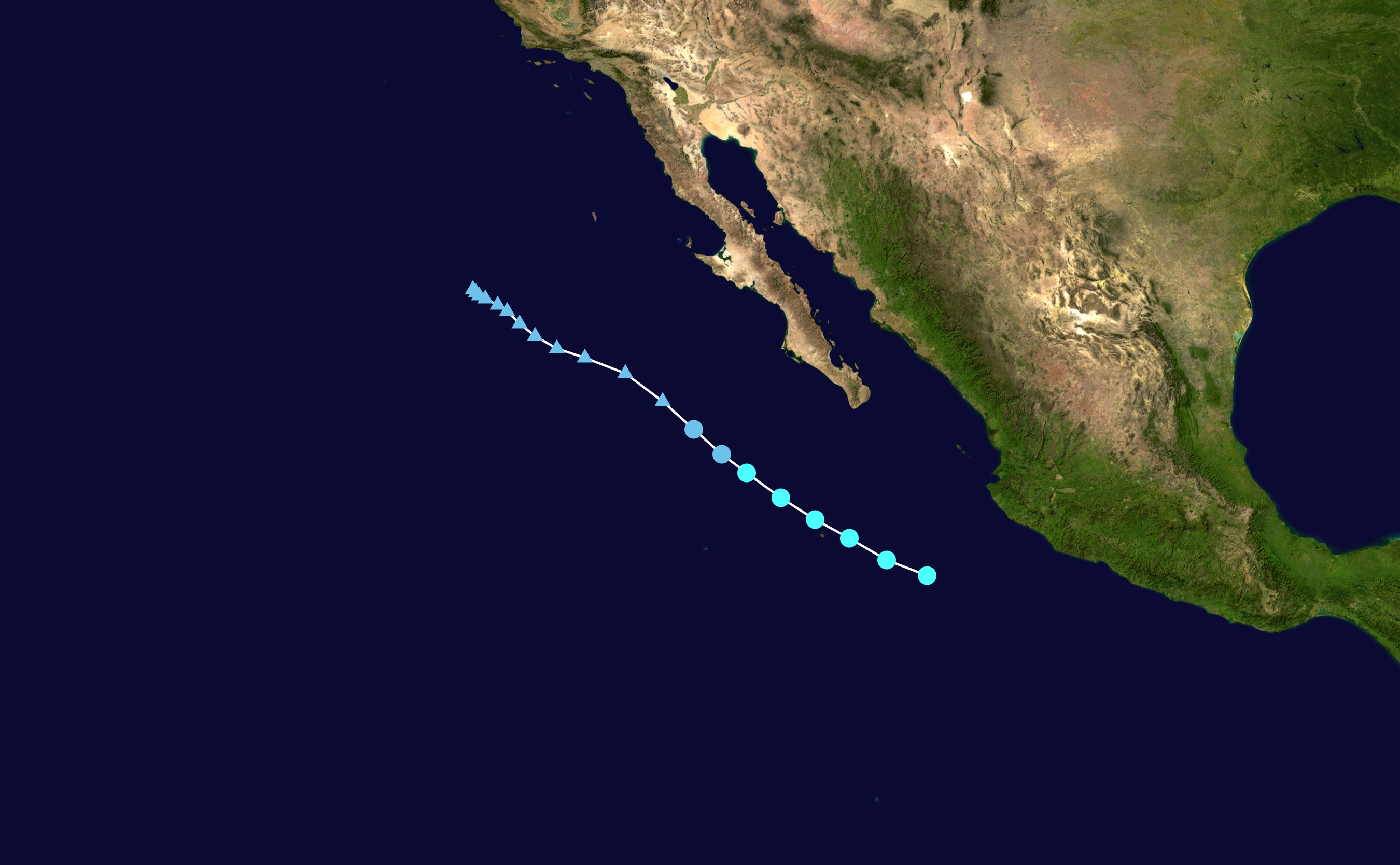
- Duration: September 2 – September 4
- Peak intensity: 45 mph (75 km/h) (1-min); 1000 mbar (hPa)

A large area of low pressure well west of Central America formed on August 29. Over the next couple of days, the system began to slowly organize as it was in an area of favorable conditions for further development. By September 1, another area of low pressure had formed just offshore Mexico, just east of the organizing low, and that same day it eventually absorbed the weaker low; this gives an extra hint for the formation of Tropical Depression Ten-E, which was south of Baja California. The next day, the depression became the tenth storm of the 2012 season; however, no significant strengthening was anticipated because of moderate to high vertical wind shear in addition to the marginally warm sea surface temperature along John's path. John remained a very weak tropical storm; it never exceeded 40 mph winds throughout its lifetime, and the main low level circulation was always separated from the main canopy of thunderstorms due to the increasing easterly wind shear. It only maintained tropical storm intensity for 18 hours; after that it weakened to a tropical depression. It held onto tropical depression status for another 18 hours, before becoming post-tropical on the following day. However, the remnant low of John continued moving northwestward for the next 3 days, before dissipating on September 7.

John brought rain and wind to the Baja California Peninsula; the Los Cabos port was closed for small craft.

=== Tropical Storm Kristy ===
- Tropical storm (SSHWS)
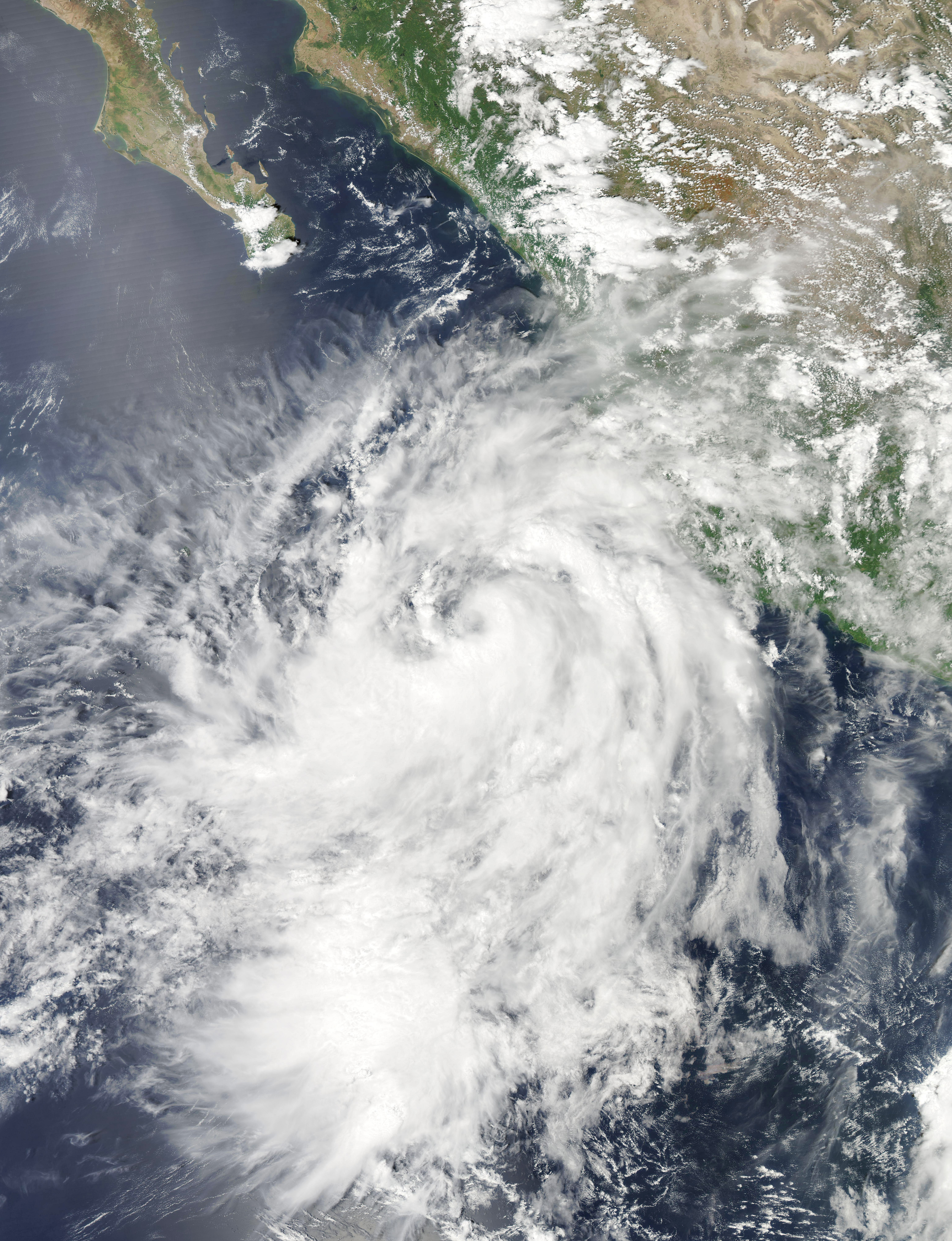
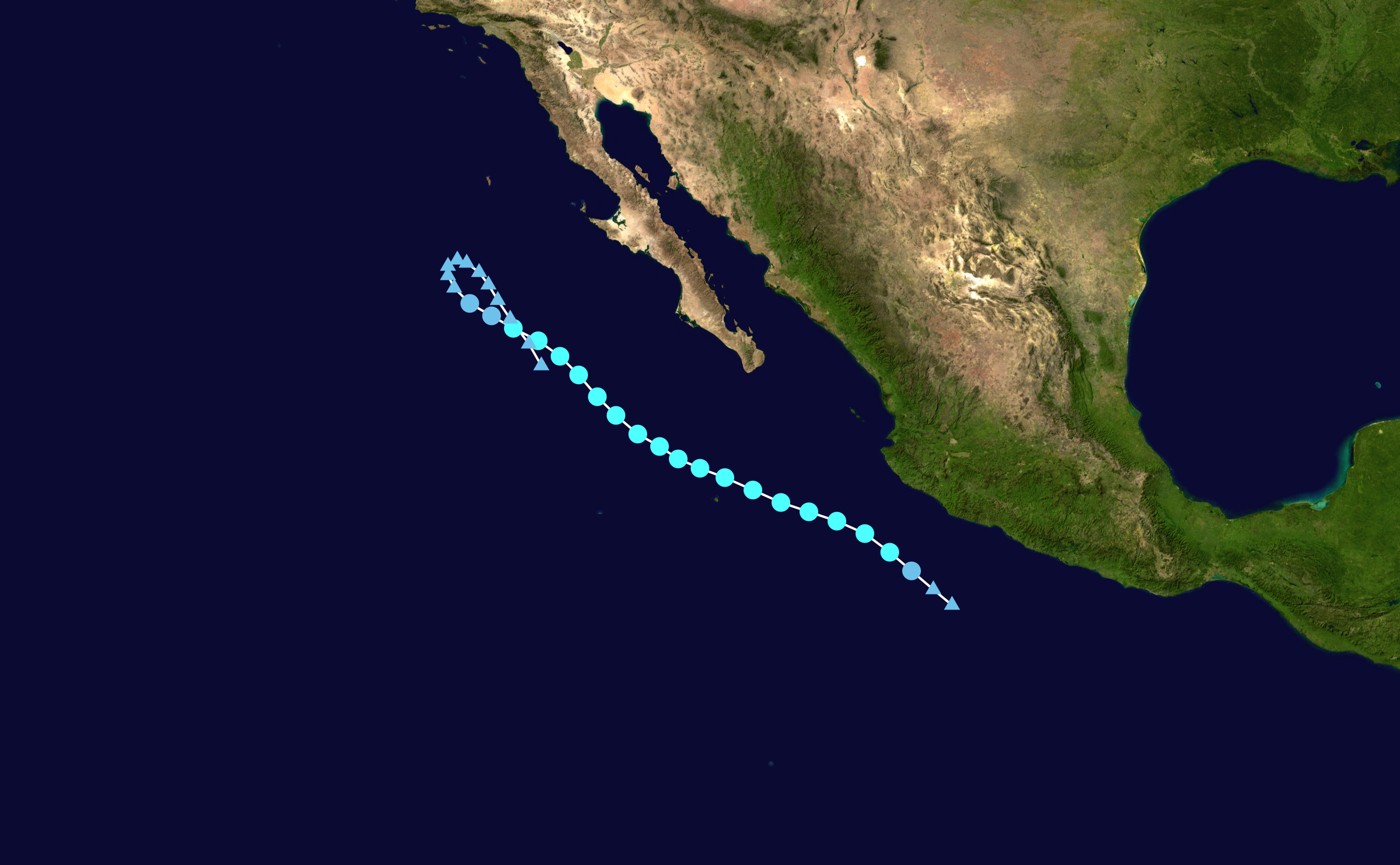
- Duration: September 12 – September 17
- Peak intensity: 60 mph (95 km/h) (1-min); 998 mbar (hPa)

On September 9, an area of low pressure formed west of Central America. The disturbance was expected to strengthen within the next couple of days, with conditions conducive for development. During the next several days, the low edged a little close towards the coast of Western Mexico, but interaction with land did not inhibit further development of this area of low pressure into the eleventh tropical depression of the season. The depression then became Tropical Storm Kristy that same day. The system was insistent on maintaining its intensity even though structure and organization began to collapse because of the unfavorable environment it encountered. September 16, Kristy was downgraded to a tropical depression, and was declared post-tropical the following day, as from a lack of deep convection. The following day, wind warnings were placed in effect for the Baja California Peninisula from the remnants associated with Kristy. Kristy also threatened Southern Mexico. During the next several days, Kristy's remnants turned towards the east before looping back towards the south, until the system dissipated very early on September 20.

=== Hurricane Lane ===
- Category 1 hurricane (SSHWS)
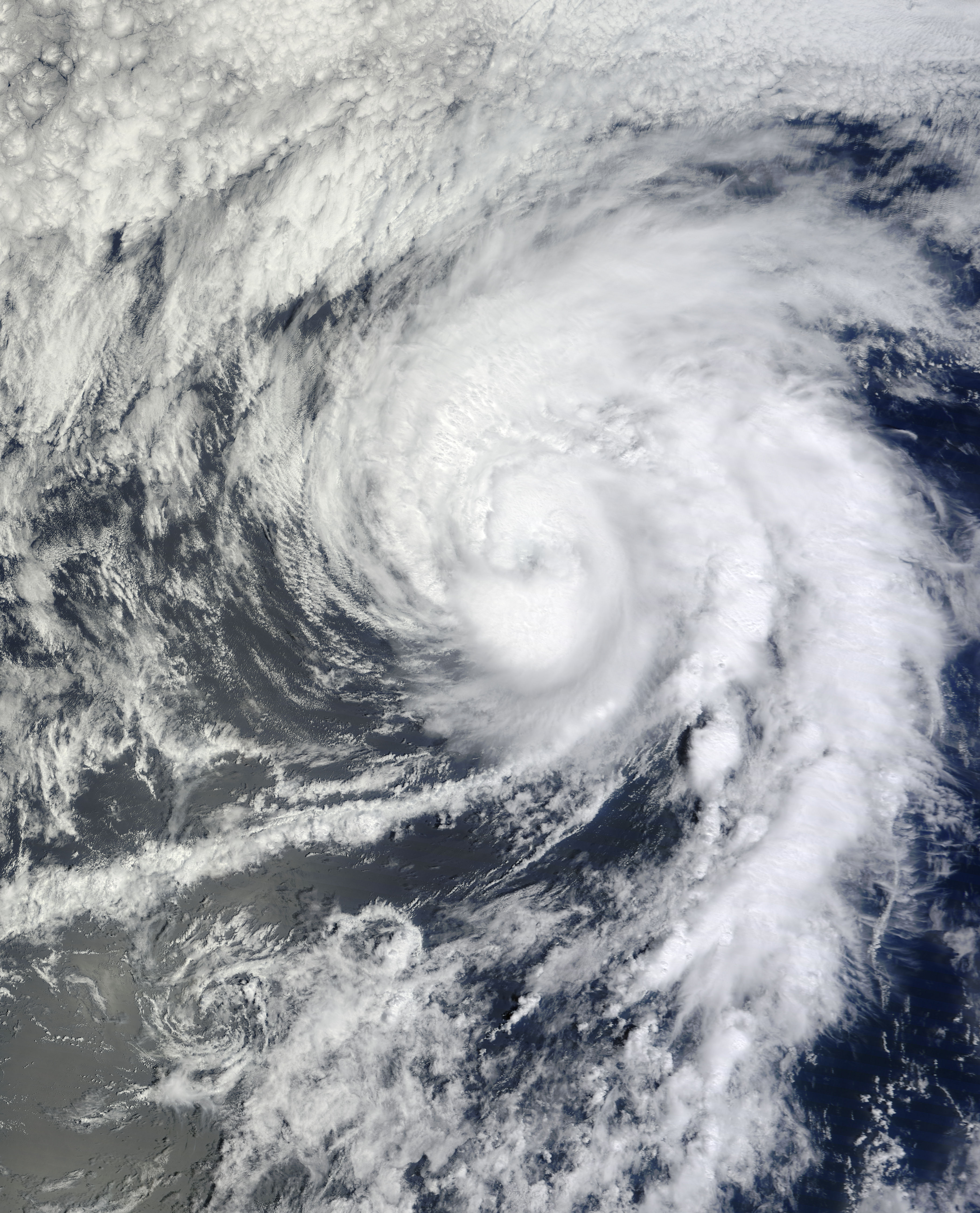
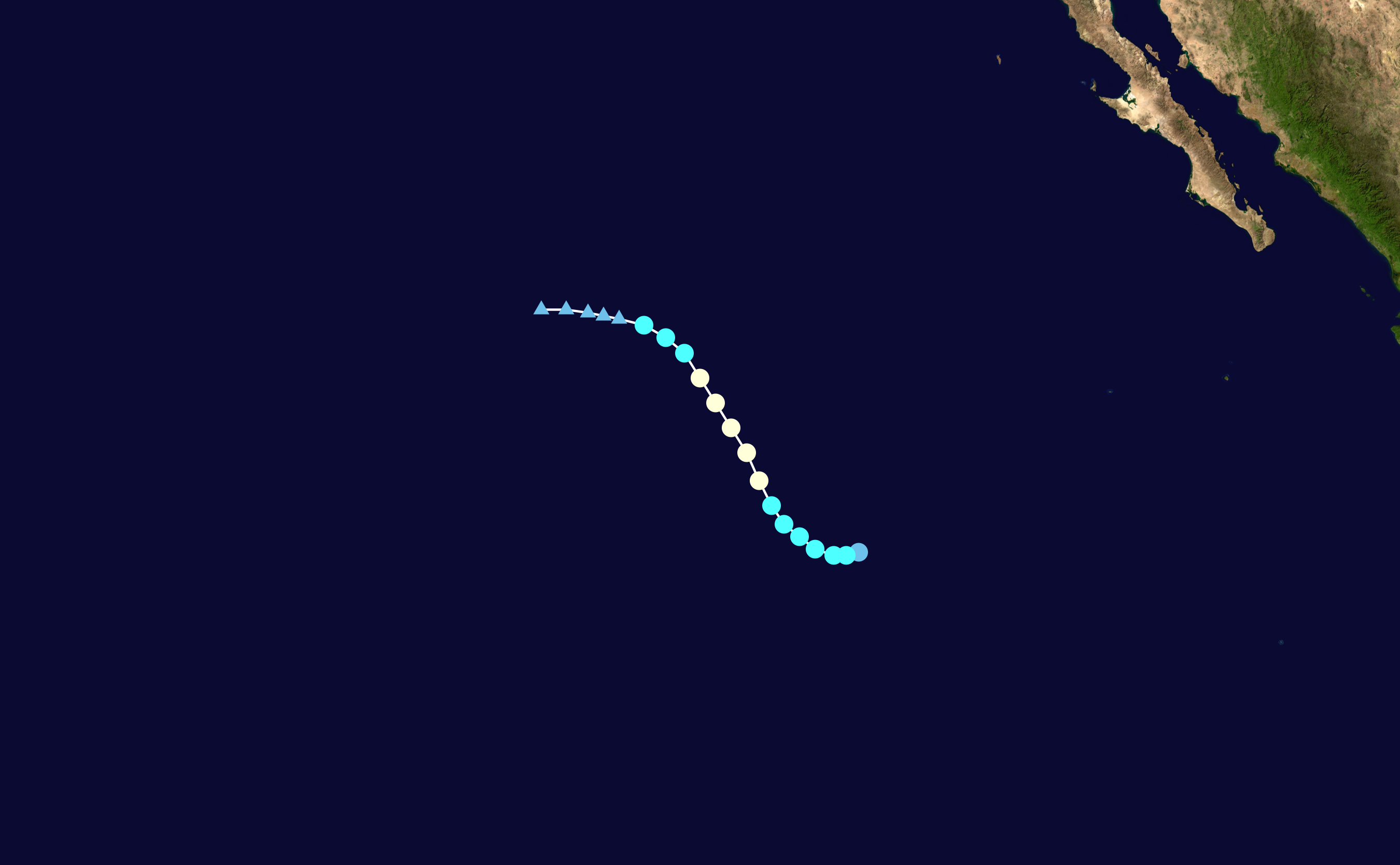
- Duration: September 15 – September 19
- Peak intensity: 85 mph (140 km/h) (1-min); 985 mbar (hPa)

Lane formed from an area of low pressure that formed just west of Tropical Storm Kristy on September 13. At first, development was not expected as it was forecast to interact with Tropical Storm Kristy. Nevertheless, the system moved away from Kristy and organized into the twelfth depression of the season, on September 15. Twelve-E became better organized that day, and was upgraded to Tropical Storm Lane, the twelfth named storm of the season. At first, Lane was expected to remain a tropical storm before weakening because of it approaching less favorable conditions. However, due to the improving satellite appearance, and some additional intensification overnight, Lane was forecast to become a hurricane within 24 hours. Lane was upgraded to hurricane status at 0900 UTC on Monday, September 17, maintaining that status for approximately 30 hours before being downgraded back to a tropical storm at 1500 UTC, on Tuesday, September 18. Lane quickly degenerated into a tropical depression, and then a remnant low during the next day. The remnant low of Lane continued moving westward for another day, before dissipating on September 20.

=== Hurricane Miriam ===
- Category 3 hurricane (SSHWS)
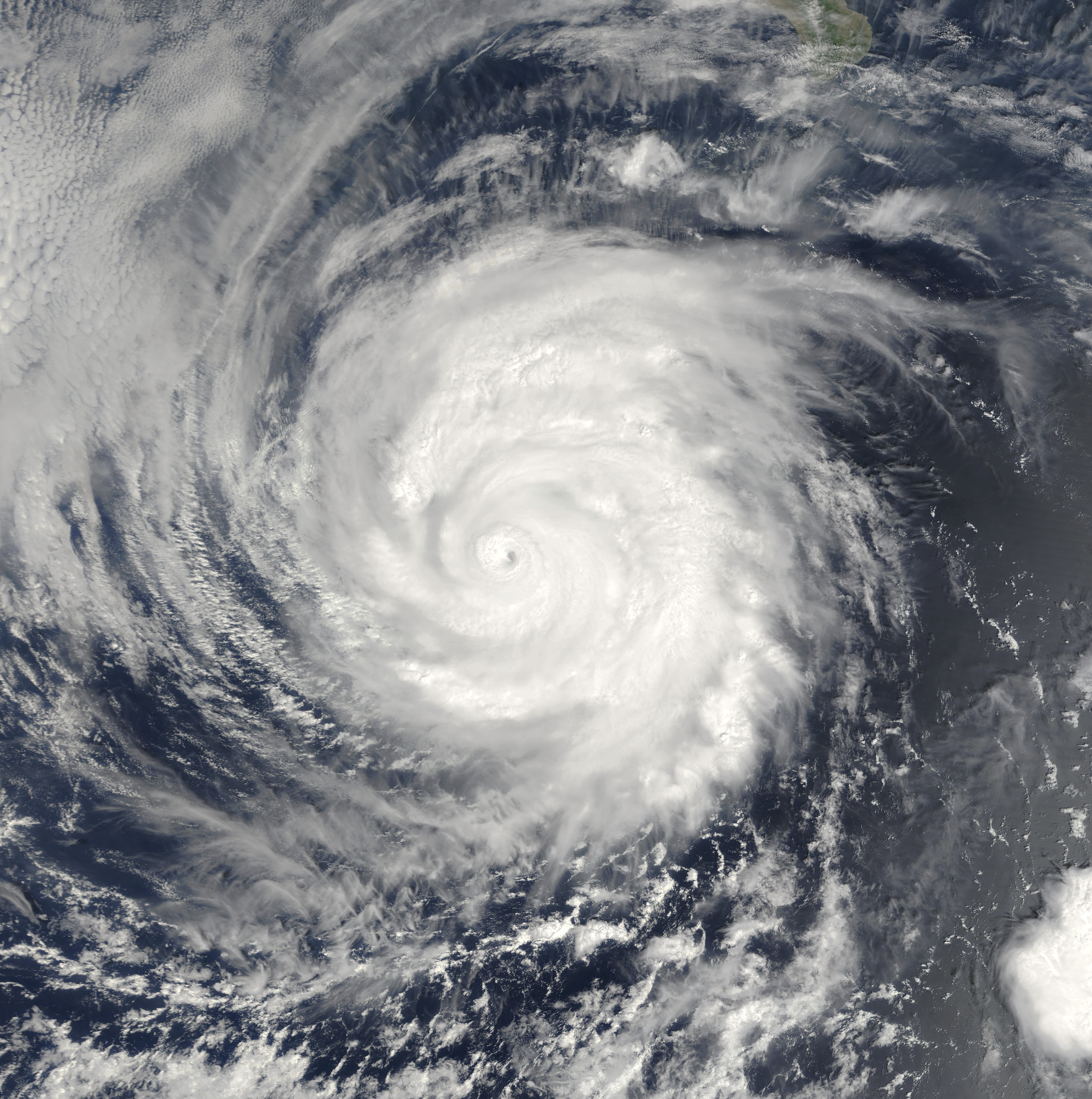
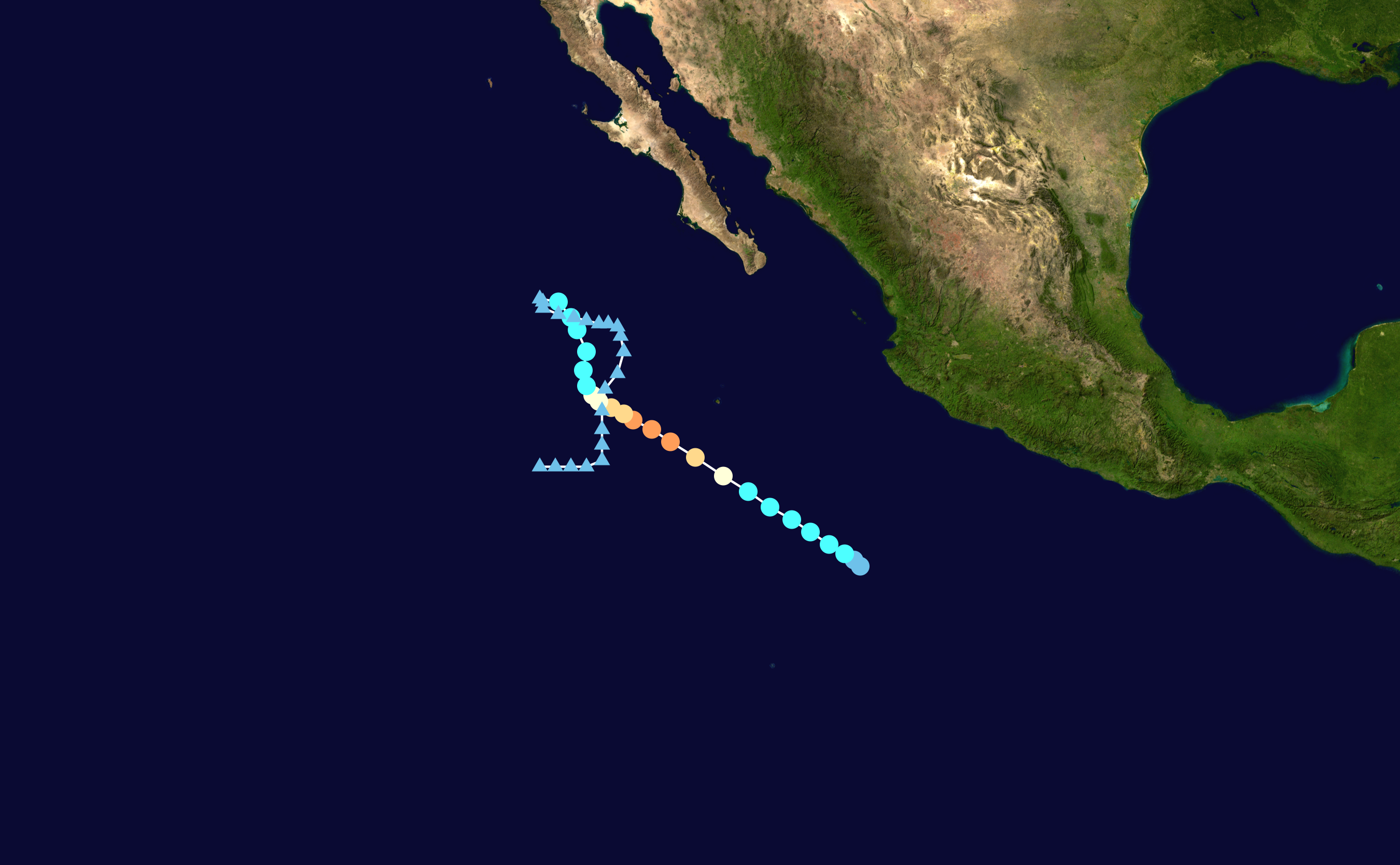
- Duration: September 22 – September 27
- Peak intensity: 120 mph (195 km/h) (1-min); 959 mbar (hPa)

On September 22, an area of low pressure that had been organizing for a couple of days became defined enough to be declared as Tropical Depression Thirteen-E. It soon strengthened to Tropical Storm Miriam, and began to further intensify over a very favorable environment. On September 23, rapid intensification was noted as a distinct possibility as vertical wind shear was forecast to remain under 5 knots for the next 36 hours. Later that evening, Miriam intensified from a 70 mph tropical storm at 2 pm PDT to a 90 mph Category 1 hurricane at 8 pm. Miriam continued to intensify on the 24th, developing a 10 nautical mile wide eye and by 8 am PDT that day, it became a Category 3 major hurricane with maximum sustained winds of 120 mph. Miriam maintained this intensity for 12 hours before weakening back into a Category 2 at 8 pm PDT the same day. Miriam began to gradually weaken and weakened to a tropical storm with 70 mph winds at 2 am PDT on the 26th. Miriam continued to steadily weaken over colder sea surface temperatures and became a tropical depression on the 27th as the last of the deep convection dissipated, as the moisture separated from the storm, and began streaming over Baja California. Miriam became a remnant low just 6 hours later. As Miriam lost its convection, the moisture drifted over the Baja California Peninsula, and into Texas. The remnant low of Hurricane Miriam continued to drift southward, until it dissipated early on October 3.

=== Tropical Storm Norman ===
- Tropical storm (SSHWS)
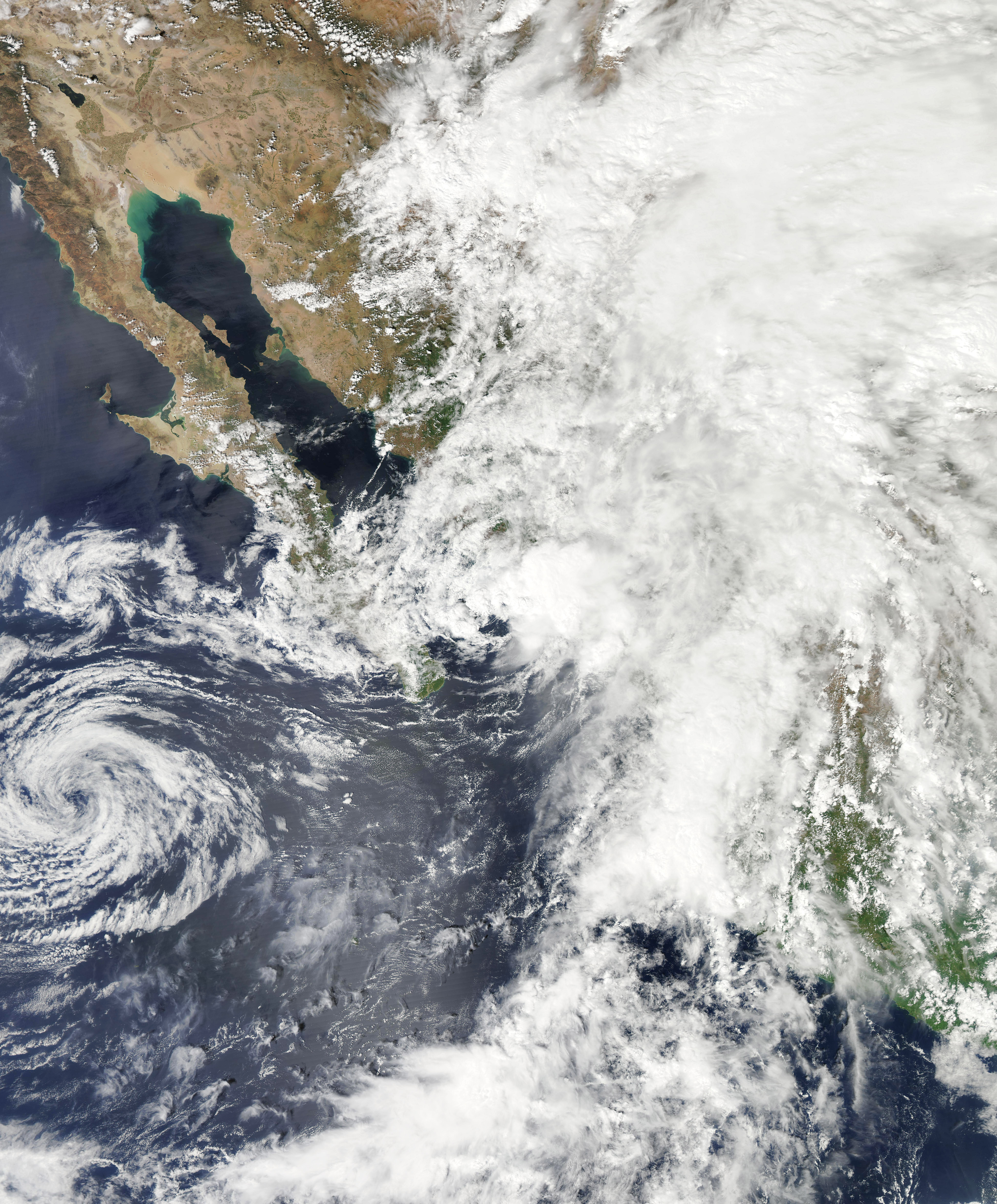
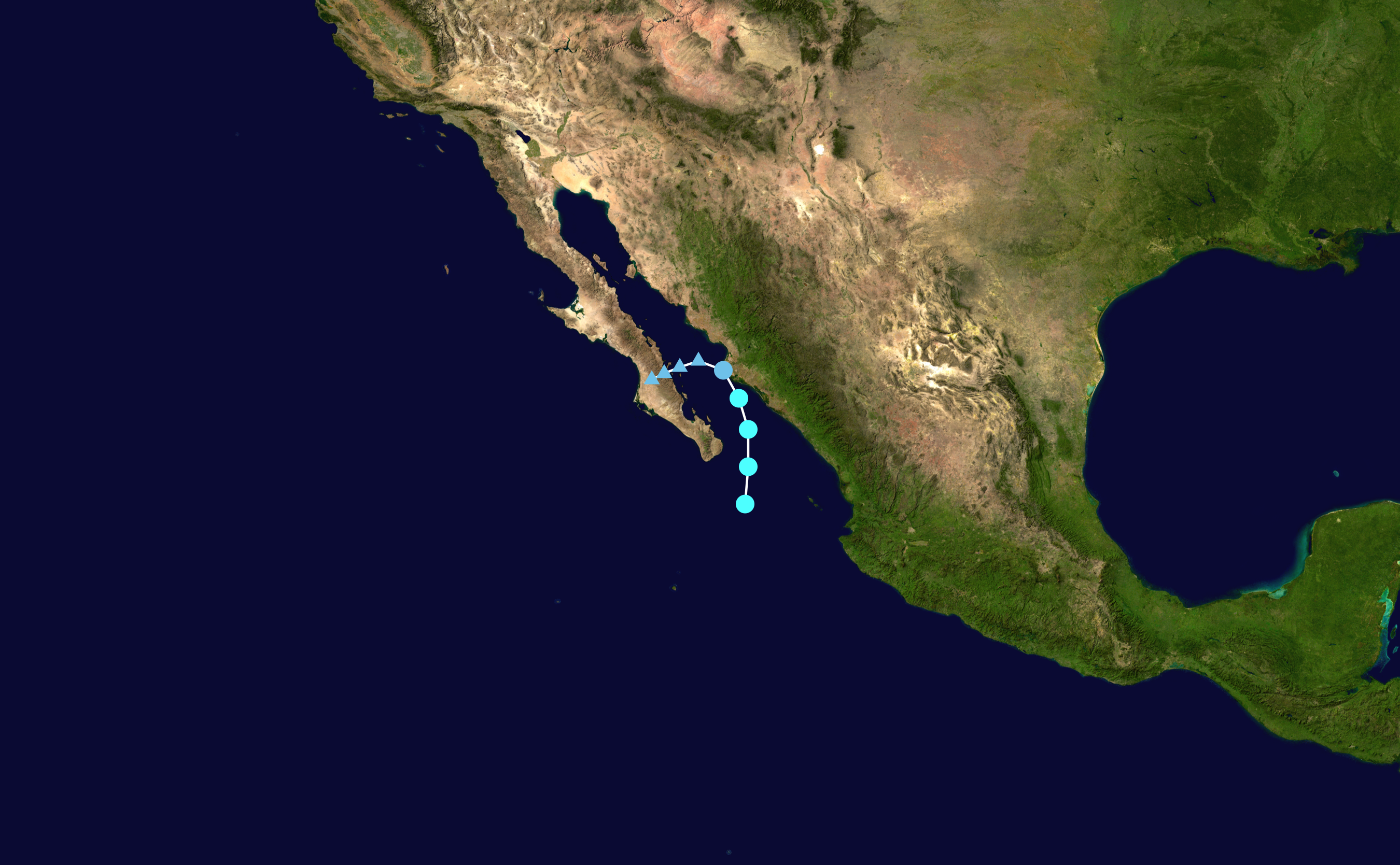
- Duration: September 28 – September 29
- Peak intensity: 50 mph (85 km/h) (1-min); 997 mbar (hPa)

Early on September 25, the National Hurricane Center began monitoring an area of disturbed weather a few hundred miles south of Acapulco, Mexico. This system originally lacked a well-defined center and was broad in size, but gradually organized as it moved towards the north-northwest. Satellite, ship, and buoy observations early on September 28 revealed that the low had become much better defined, and at 1500 UTC, the first advisory was issued on Tropical Storm Norman, located at the time about 85 mi (135 km) east of Cabo San Lucas, Mexico. Norman weakened as it approached the coast of western Mexico and it became a tropical depression on September 29. The depression made landfall about just west of Topolobampo, but quickly emerged into the Gulf of California. The last of the deep convection associated with Norman dissipated early on September 29, and Norman became a post-tropical remnant low later that day. Early on September 30, the remnant low of Norman dissipated.

=== Tropical Storm Olivia ===
- Tropical storm (SSHWS)
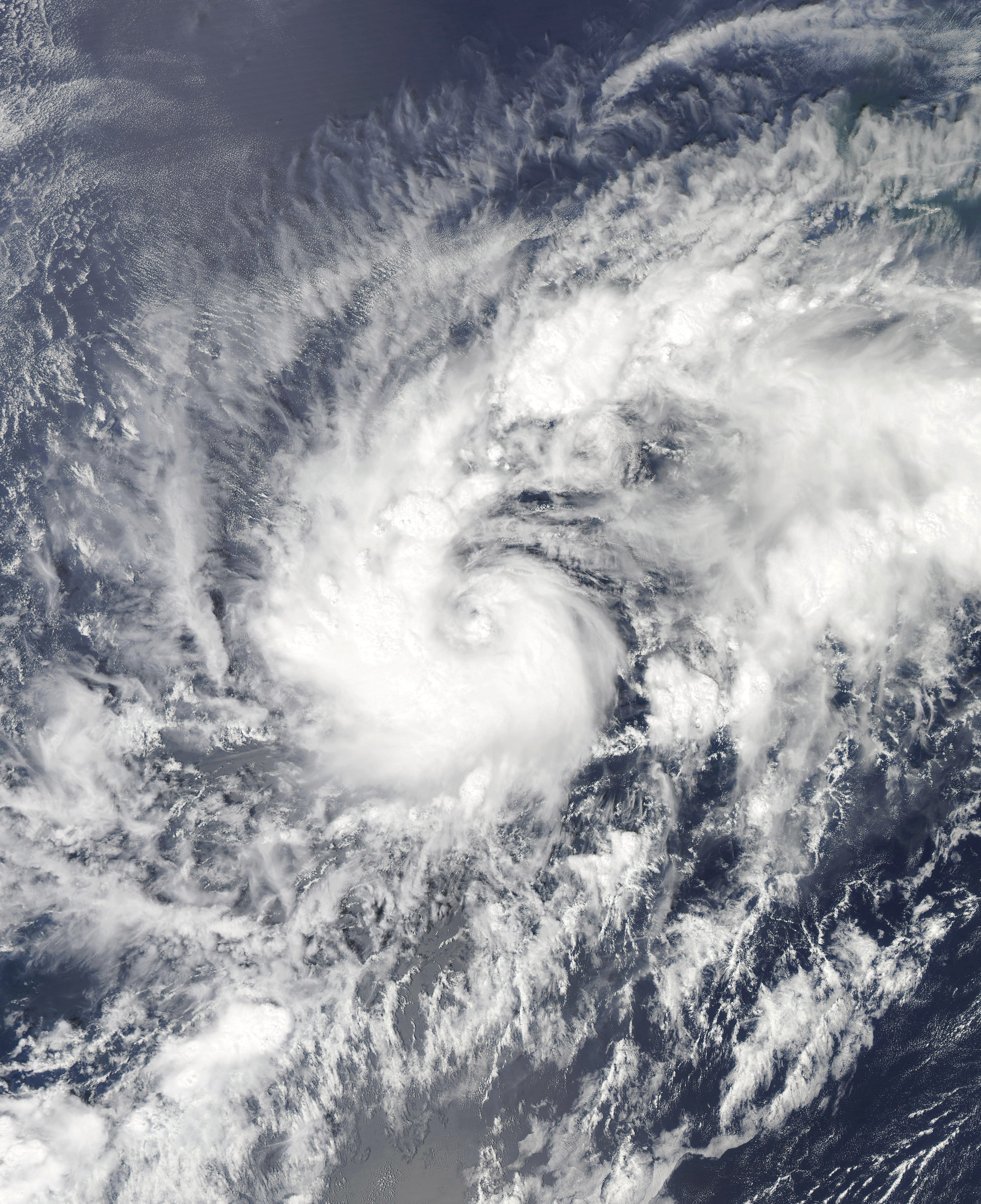
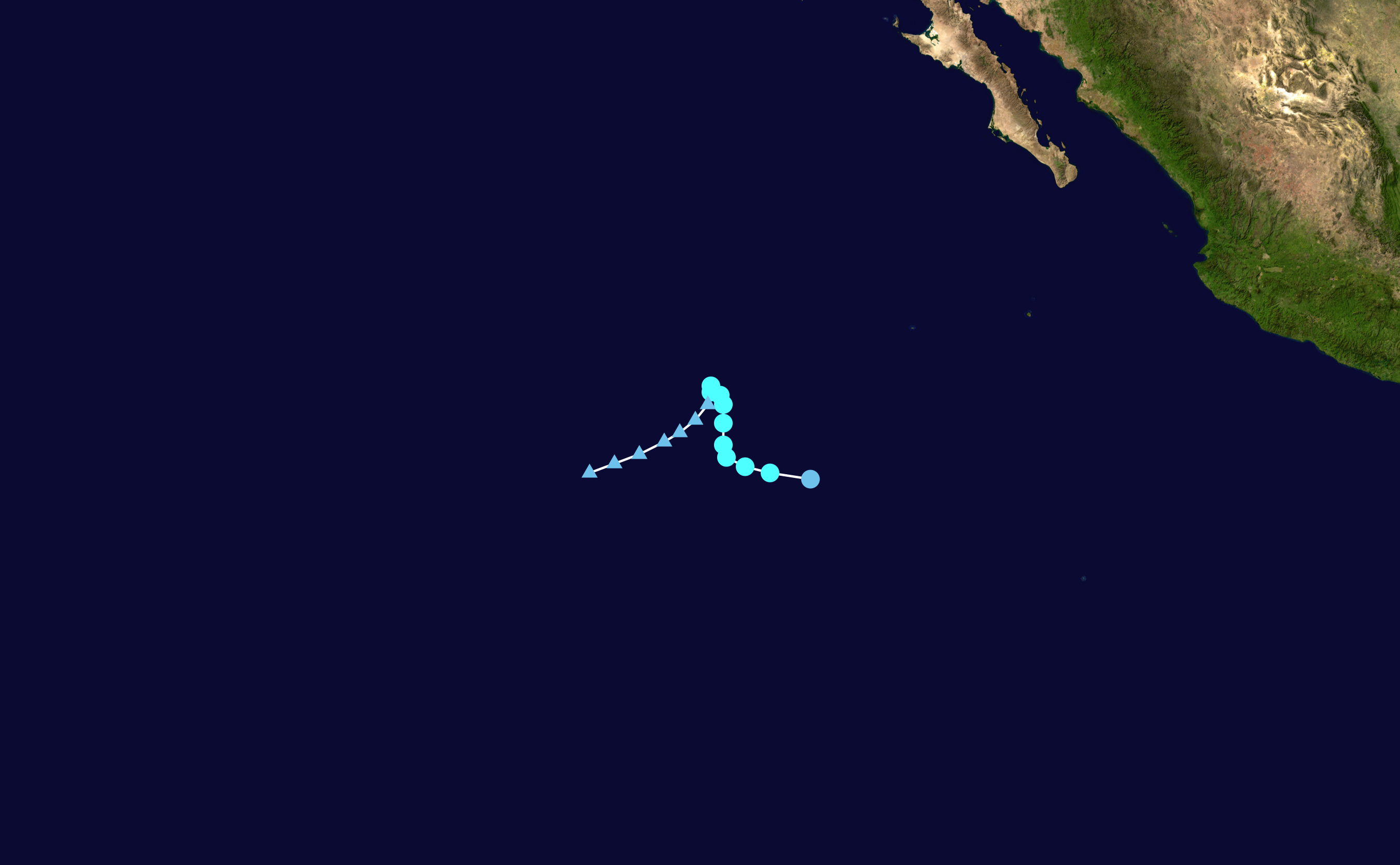
- Duration: October 6 – October 8
- Peak intensity: 60 mph (95 km/h) (1-min); 997 mbar (hPa)

An area of low pressure that formed in the eastern Pacific quickly began to organize and eventually gained enough convection and organization to be declared Tropical Depression Fifteen-E on October 6. However, the environment was only marginal for development, and NHC forecaster Lixion Avila only forecasted Fifteen-E to become a 40 mph tropical storm before weakening. Over the next several hours, a convective cloud band gained curvature over the northwest quadrant of the circulation and a central dense overcast persisted, and on this basis and Dvorak classifications, Fifteen-E was upgraded to Tropical Storm Olivia with an estimated wind speed of 45 mph. Despite the convective banding breaking off and becoming disconnected from the inner circulation of Olivia overnight, Dvorak T-numbers suggested that Olivia packed 60 mph winds. Olivia moved over very warm water (29 degrees C), but stopped strengthening on the morning of the 7th as it lost its banding features. However, the central dense overcast expanded and forecasters noted that additional strengthening was a possibility. Olivia continued moving northward, but with no change in strength until the afternoon of October 8, when the low-level circulation became exposed to the southwest of the main area of deep convection around 6:00 AM PDT. At 2:00 PM PDT the same day, it was reported that the deep convection was located about 100 nautical miles away from the low-level center. As southwesterly shear remained strong, the low- and mid-level centers of Olivia completely decoupled late on October 8, with last-light visible satellite imagery showing it as a swirl of low clouds with the strongest convection a few hundred miles away from the center. At 2:00 AM PDT on October 9, Olivia was declared post-tropical, as it had not been producing significant deep convection for the past 6 to 12 hours and the low-level center was moving even further away from the few convective cells that remained. The cyclone was expected to weaken and open up into a trough within 48 hours at the time of the last discussion. Late on October 10, the remnant of Olivia dissipated.

=== Hurricane Paul ===
- Category 3 hurricane (SSHWS)
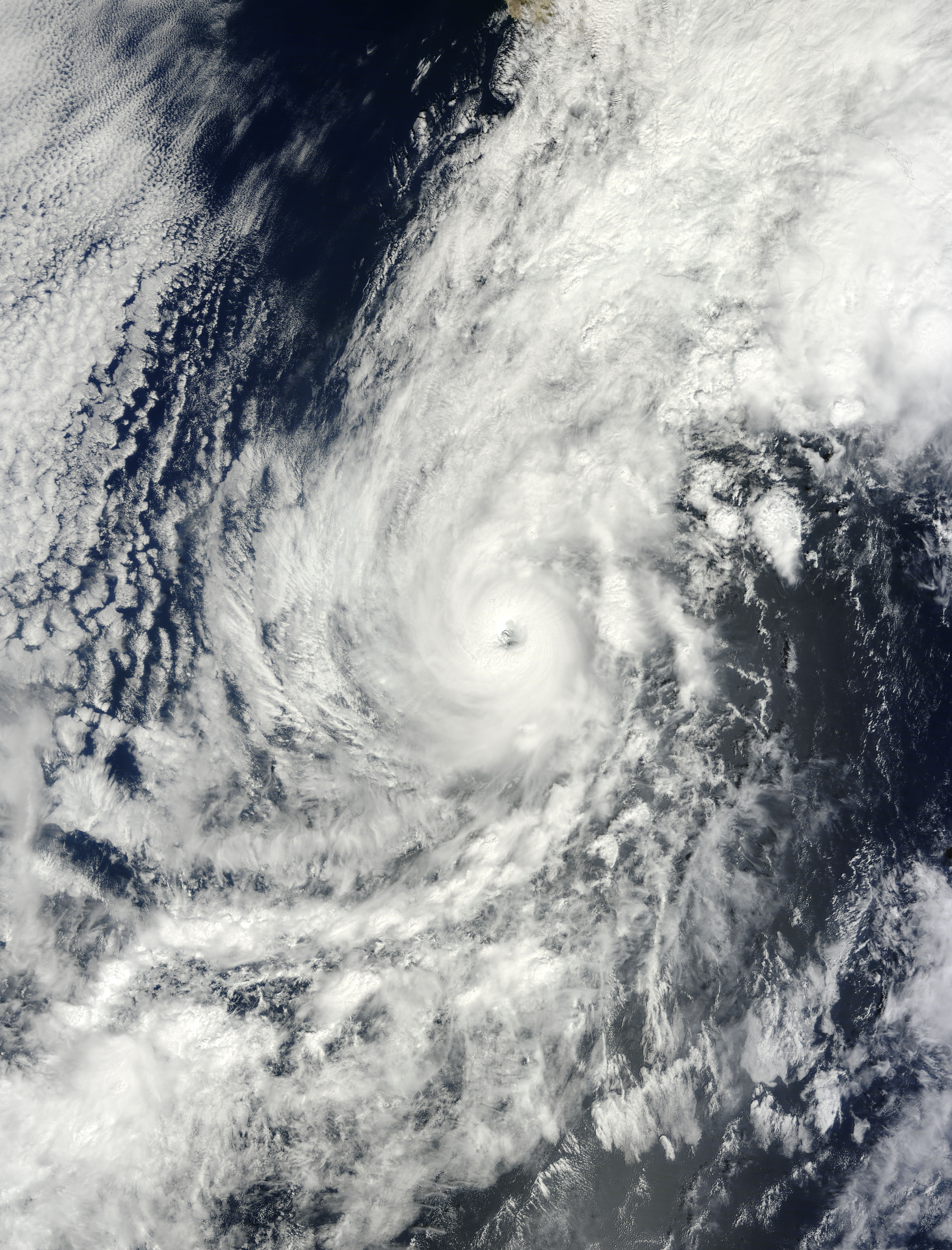
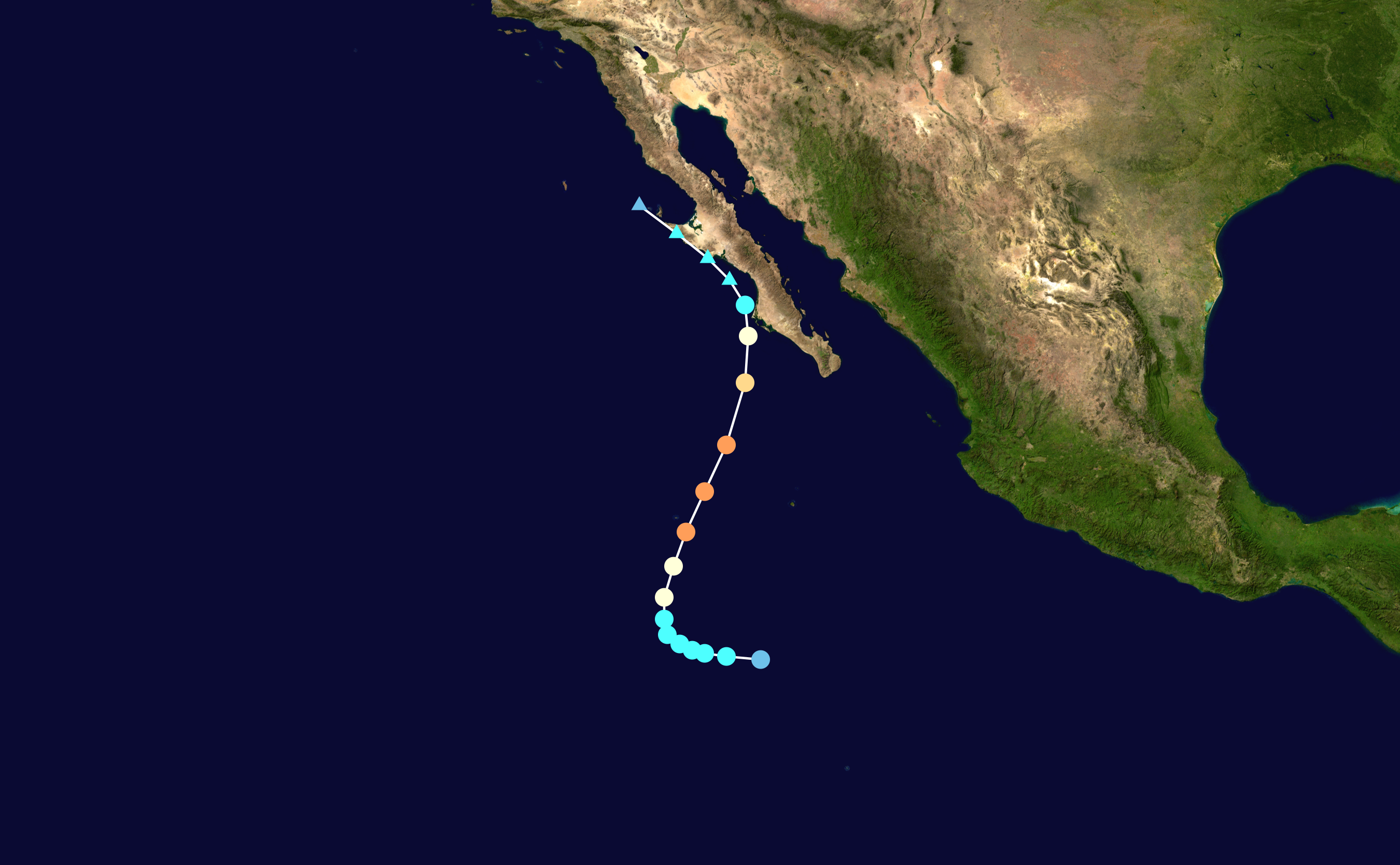
- Duration: October 13 – October 17
- Peak intensity: 120 mph (195 km/h) (1-min); 959 mbar (hPa)

Early on October 10, the National Hurricane Center first began monitoring a trough of low pressure off the southern coast of Mexico. With a disorganized area of convection, the system moved slowly westward, and conditions allowed for gradual development. Initially, upper-level winds were only marginally favorable, and although the thunderstorms remained disorganized, the NHC estimated a 50% chance for development by early on October 12. The next day, the system became better defined, and the NHC classified it as Tropical Storm Paul at 2100 UTC that day, about 660 mi (1,060 km) south-southwest of the southern tip of the Baja California Peninsula. Upon forming, Paul skipped the tropical depression stage, and it had a well-defined circulation with organized convection. It moved westward due to a mid-level ridge that extended westward from Mexico.

Warm waters, very little wind shear, and a moist environment allowed Paul to quickly intensify and developed organized rainbands. Easterly wind shear was the primary inhibitor factor of rapid intensification. On October 14, Paul began moving northward while rounding a ridge, also influenced by an upper-level low west of Baja California. An eye began developing early on October 15, and later that day Paul intensified into a hurricane. The cloud pattern became increasingly symmetrical, and the storm underwent rapid deepening on October 15. It developed a well-defined eye, prompting the NHC to estimate peak winds of 120 mph (190 km/h); this made it the fifth major hurricane season of the season. However, increasing southwesterly wind shear quickly imparted weakening, causing the eye to deteriorate by early on October 16. Shortly thereafter, the NHC reported that Paul was no longer a major hurricane. During the afternoon hours of October 17, Paul was downgraded to a tropical depression, and hours later, the storm was declared a remnant low. The remnant low of Hurricane Paul persisted for another day, before dissipating on October 18. During the next two days, remnant moisture from Paul caused drizzle and light rain across Southern California.

Across the city of La Paz, damage to roads was estimated at MX$200 million (US$15.5 million).

=== Tropical Storm Rosa ===
- Tropical storm (SSHWS)
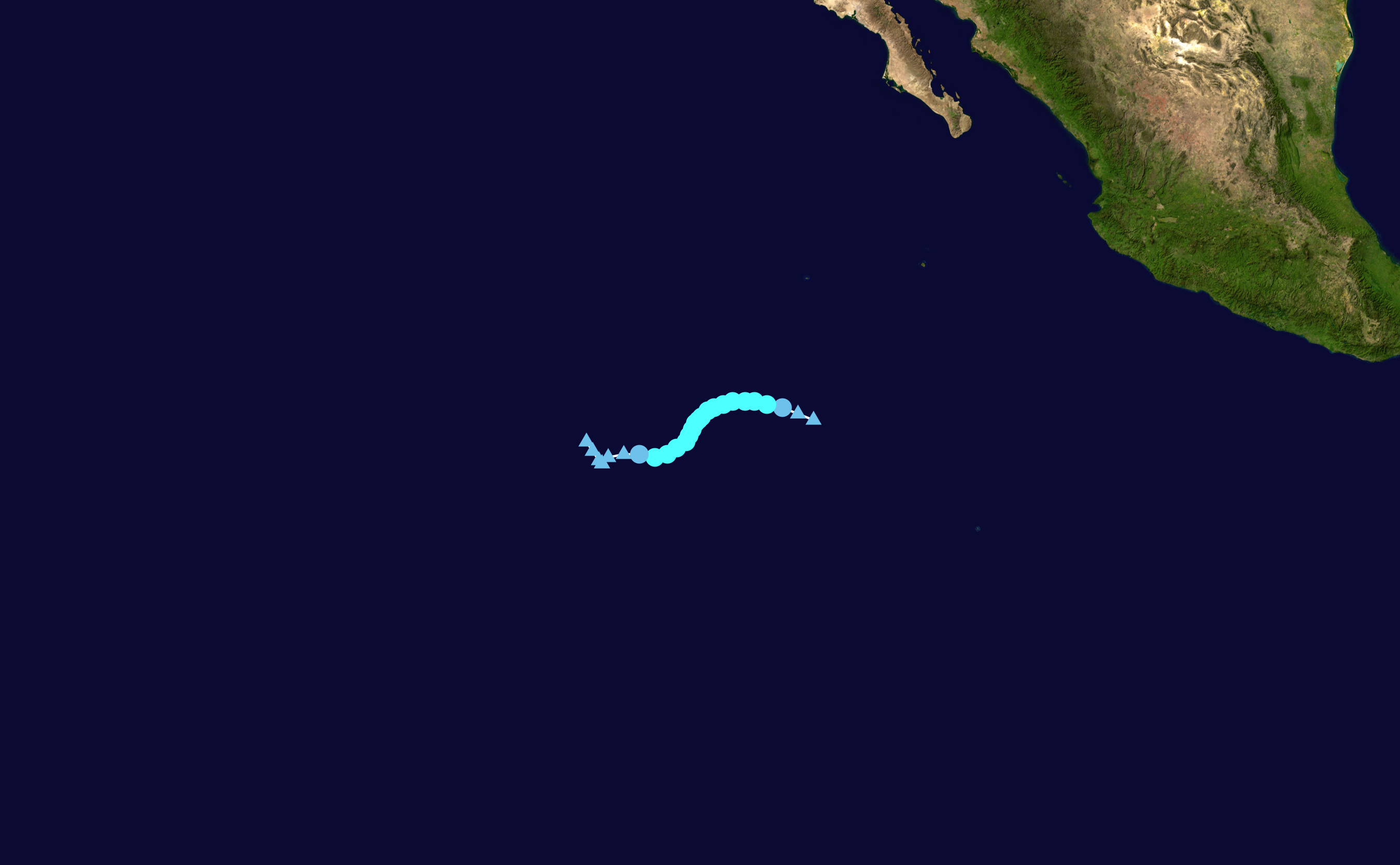
- Duration: October 30 – November 3
- Peak intensity: 50 mph (85 km/h) (1-min); 1001 mbar (hPa)

The passage of the Madden–Julian oscillation (MJO) in late October resulted in a breakdown of the ITCZ and subsequent development of a disturbance by October 25. It developed a well-defined surface low four days later, and an increase in deep convection and its organization resulted in the formation of the final tropical depression of the season at 6:00 UTC on October 30. The depression strengthened into Tropical Storm Rosa six hours later. Moving northwestward to westward under a weak low-level ridge, Rosa gradually intensified until it reach its peak intensity with 50 mph winds and a minimum pressure of 1,001 millibars early the next day. Rosa turned southwestward and maintained its strength until it moved into a region of strong wind shear on November 2, where it steadily weakened to a tropical depression by 12:00 UTC on November 3. The depression degenerated to a remnant low six hours later. The low moved irregularly northwestward until dissipating early on November 5.

== Storm names ==
The following list of names was used for named storms that formed in the North Pacific Ocean east of 140°W during 2012. This was the same list used for the 2006 season, as no names were retired after that season. No names were retired from the list following the season, and so it was used again for the 2018 season.

- Aletta
- Bud
- Carlotta
- Daniel *
- Emilia *
- Fabio
- Gilma
- Hector
- Ileana
- John
- Kristy
- Lane
- Miriam
- Norman
- Olivia
- Paul
- Rosa
- Sergio (unused)
- Tara (unused)
- Vicente (unused)
- Willa (unused)
- Xavier (unused)
- Yolanda (unused)
- Zeke (unused)

For storms that form in the North Pacific between 140°W to the International Date Line, the names come from a series of four rotating lists. Names are used one after the other without regard to year, and when the bottom of one list is reached, the next named storm receives the name at the top of the next list. No named storms formed within the area in 2012. Named storms in the table above that crossed into the area during the season are noted (*).

== Season effects ==
This is a table of all of the tropical cyclones that formed in the 2012 Pacific hurricane season. It includes their name, duration, peak classification and intensities, areas affected, damage, and death totals. Deaths in parentheses are additional and indirect (an example of an indirect death would be a traffic accident), but were still related to that storm. Damage and deaths include totals while the storm was extratropical, a wave, or a low, and all of the damage figures are in 2012 USD.

Saffir–Simpson scale
TD	TS	C1	C2	C3	C4	C5

2012 Pacific hurricane season statistics
Storm name	Dates active	Storm category at peak intensity	Max 1-min wind mph (km/h)	Min. press. (mbar)	Areas affected	Damage (US$)	Deaths	Ref(s).
Aletta	May 14–19	Tropical storm	50 (85)	1000	None	None	None	
Bud	May 20–26	Category 3 hurricane	115 (185)	961	Western Mexico	Minimal	None	
Carlotta	June 14–16	Category 2 hurricane	110 (175)	973	Southwestern Mexico	$12.4 million	7	
Daniel	July 4–12	Category 3 hurricane	115 (185)	961	None	None	None	
Emilia	July 7–15	Category 4 hurricane	140 (220)	945	None	None	None	
Fabio	July 12–18	Category 2 hurricane	110 (175)	966	Baja California Peninsula, California, Western United States	None	None	
Gilma	August 7–11	Category 1 hurricane	80 (130)	984	None	None	None	
Hector	August 11–16	Tropical storm	50 (85)	995	Western Mexico, Baja California Peninsula	Minimal	None	
Ileana	August 27 – September 2	Category 1 hurricane	85 (140)	978	None	None	None	
John	September 2–4	Tropical storm	45 (75)	1000	Baja California Peninsula	Minimal	None	
Kristy	September 12–17	Tropical storm	60 (95)	998	Baja California Peninsula	Minimal	None	
Lane	September 15–19	Category 1 hurricane	85 (130)	985	None	None	None	
Miriam	September 22–27	Category 3 hurricane	120 (195)	959	Baja California Peninsula, Texas	None	None	
Norman	September 28–29	Tropical storm	50 (85)	997	Western Mexico, Baja California Peninsula, Northwestern Mexico, Texas	Minimal	1	
Olivia	October 6–8	Tropical storm	60 (95)	997	None	None	None	
Paul	October 13–17	Category 3 hurricane	120 (195)	959	Baja California Peninsula, Northwestern Mexico	$15.6 million	None	
Rosa	October 30 – November 3	Tropical storm	50 (85)	1001	None	None	None	
Season aggregates
17 systems	May 14 – November 3		140 (220)	945		$28 million	8	

== See also ==
- Tropical cyclones in 2012
- List of Pacific hurricanes
- Pacific hurricane season
- 2012 Atlantic hurricane season
- 2012 Pacific typhoon season
- 2012 North Indian Ocean cyclone season
- South-West Indian Ocean cyclone seasons: 2011–12, 2012–13
- Australian region cyclone seasons: 2011–12, 2012–13
- South Pacific cyclone seasons: 2011–12, 2012–13
