= Tropical Storm Boris (2014) =

Pacific tropical storm in 2014

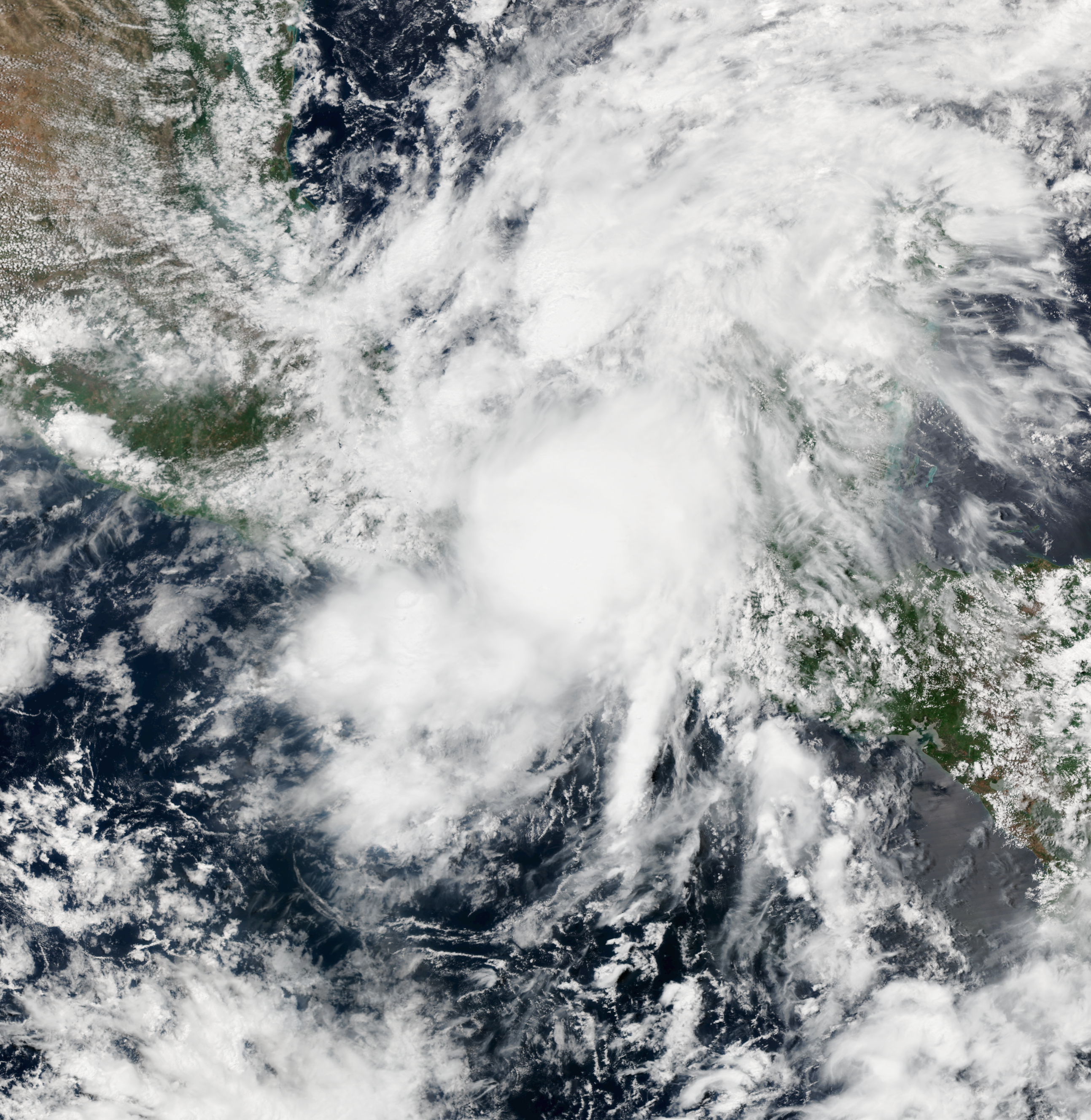
- Boris at peak intensity on June 3

Meteorological history
- Formed: June 2, 2014
- Dissipated: June 4, 2014

Tropical storm
- 1-minute sustained (SSHWS/NWS)
- Highest winds: 45 mph (75 km/h)
- Lowest pressure: 998 mbar (hPa); 29.47 inHg

Overall effects
- Fatalities: 6 total
- Damage: $54.1 million (2014 USD)
- Areas affected: Southwestern Mexico, Guatemala
- IBTrACS
- Part of the 2014 Pacific hurricane season

Tropical Storm Boris was a weak and short-lived tropical cyclone that brought rainfall to the Isthmus of Tehuantepec and surrounding areas in June 2014. The second named storm of the season, Boris developed from the interaction of a low-level trough and a Kelvin wave south of Mexico late on June 2. Initially a tropical depression, the system moved generally northward and strengthened into Tropical Storm Boris by midday on June 3. About six hours later, Boris peaked with maximum sustained winds of 45 mph (75 km/h) – indicative of a weak tropical storm. By early on June 4, interaction with land caused the storm to weaken, deteriorating to a tropical depression. Later that day, Boris degenerated into a remnant low pressure, before fully dissipating over the Gulf of Tehuantepec on June 5.

As Boris approached land, tropical cyclone warnings and watches were issued, school classes were canceled, and evacuations occurred in Southwestern Mexico and portions of Guatemala. The precursor to Boris and the storm itself brought heavy rainfall to area. In Mexico, overflowing streams left minor damage in Chiapas; four people were injured when a house partially collapsed. One death was reported in the country when a tree fell at a high school in Xalapa. Flooding in Guatemala forced 198 people to flee their homes. A mudslide caused five deaths and injured seven others. Overall, 20 mudslides were reported, damaging 13 roads. Additionally, 223 homes were damaged, including 11 severely. More than 5,000 people were left isolated in Quetzaltenango after a portion of the main road to the city was inundated by water.

== Meteorological history ==
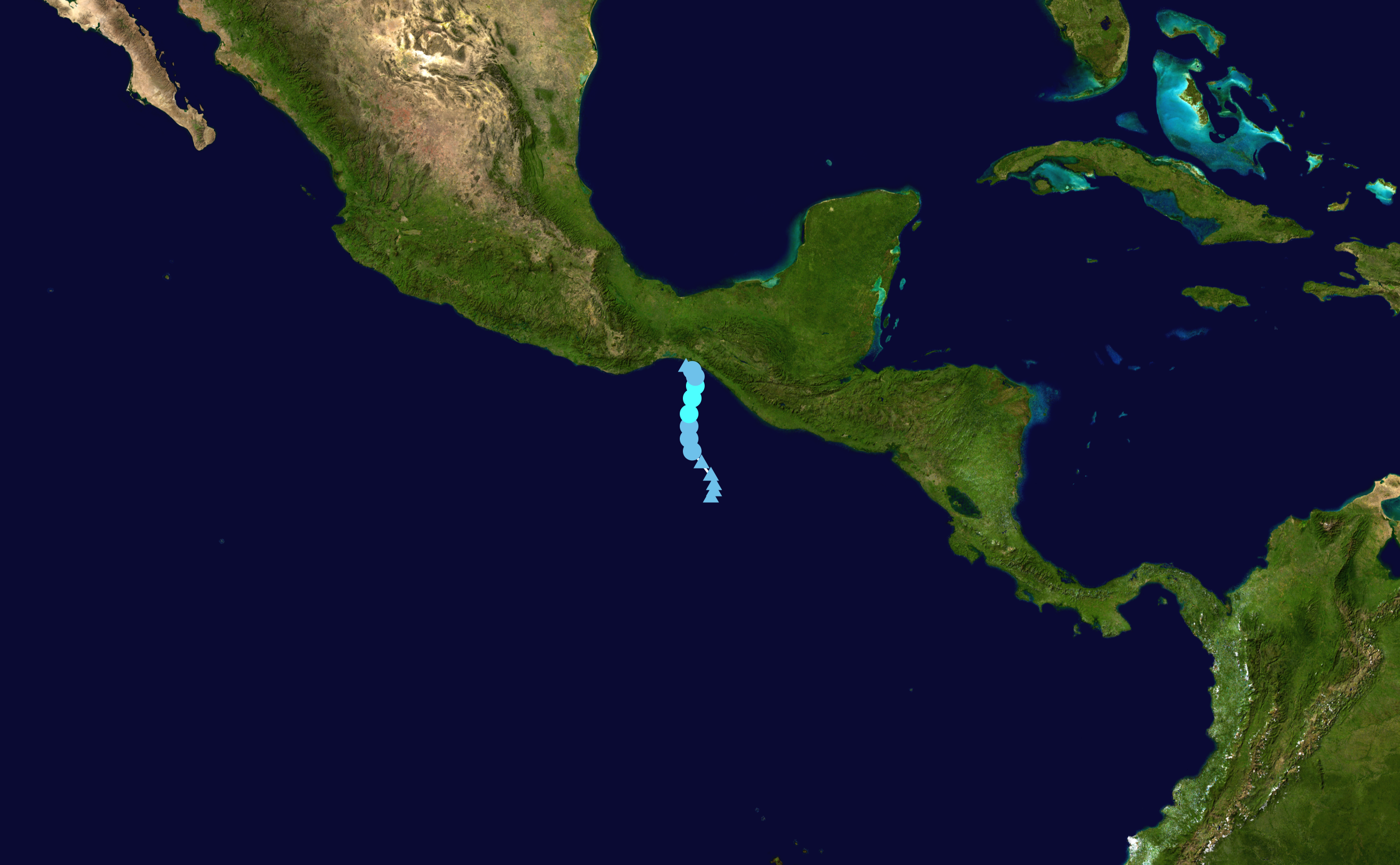
Map plotting the storm's track and intensity, according to the Saffir–Simpson scale Map key Saffir–Simpson scale Tropical depression (≤38 mph, ≤62 km/h) Tropical storm (39–73 mph, 63–118 km/h) Category 1 (74–95 mph, 119–153 km/h) Category 2 (96–110 mph, 154–177 km/h) Category 3 (111–129 mph, 178–208 km/h) Category 4 (130–156 mph, 209–251 km/h) Category 5 (≥157 mph, ≥252 km/h) Unknown Storm type Tropical cyclone Subtropical cyclone Extratropical cyclone, remnant low, tropical disturbance, or monsoon depression

Early on May 30, the National Hurricane Center (NHC) began monitoring an area of disturbed weather, perhaps in connection to a tropical wave, several hundred miles south of southeastern Mexico for tropical development within a five-day period. Within an increasingly favorable environment for formation, the disturbance was assigned a medium chance of becoming a tropical cyclone within the next 48 hours later that day, and a high chance of development on May 31 as it became increasingly better organized. In conjunction with a ship observation and satellite intensity estimates, the disturbance acquired enough organization to be deemed a tropical depression at 2100 UTC on June 2.

Over the subsequent hours after its formation, little change in organization was noted, with multiple low-level centers rotating within a broader circulation positioned on the south side of the deepest convection. However, a pair of Advanced Scatterometer (ASCAT) passes early on June 3 revealed sustained winds just above the tropical storm threshold, and the depression was subsequently upgraded to Tropical Storm Boris. Despite initial forecasts of several days over water, the center of circulation moved quickly northward in response to an upper-level low west of the system, and the bulk of Boris's deep convection moved ashore near Chiapas, Mexico around 0600 UTC on June 4. However, the cyclone's northward motion slowed, and the low-level circulation remained offshore, failing to ever make landfall. Thereafter, the system degenerated into a trough of low pressure about 80 mi (130 km) east-northeast of Salina Cruz, Mexico.

== Preparations and impact ==
Infrared satellite loop of Boris approaching Chiapas on June 3

A few tropical cyclone warnings and watches were issued as Tropical Storm Boris approached Southwestern Mexico. At 21:00 UTC on June 2, a tropical storm watch was posted from Salina Cruz, Oaxaca, to the Mexico–Guatemala border, which was upgraded to a tropical storm warning early the following day. The tropical storm warning was discontinued by 09:00 UTC on June 4. In Chiapas, 122 municipalities were placed on alert and schools were suspended in four of them. All but four municipalities in Chiapas were placed on "yellow" alert, while the remaining four were placed on "orange" alert. Statewide, around 16,000 were evacuated. Education services were suspended for 30 municipalities in Oaxaca. Comisión Nacional del Agua warned residents to expect up to 27.56 in (700 mm) of precipitation in Chiapas and Oaxaca, 19.69 in (500 mm) of rain in Veracruz and Tabasco, and 11.81 in (300 mm) in Campeche and Quintana Roo. Due to the threat of mudslides in Guatemala, classes were suspended in nine school districts, affecting 1.25 million pupils. "Orange" and "yellow" alerts were also posted for the entire country. A total of 434 emergency response teams were set up to deal with landslides.

Boris and its precursor disturbance brought heavy precipitation to Guatemala, peaking at 9.27 in (235 mm) in Mazatenango, Suchitepéquez. Over 5,000 people were left isolated in Quetzaltenango, after heavy rainfall left about 2,624.67 ft (800.00 m) of the main road to the city inundated with water. Five people were killed in a mudslide, seven were hurt, and 55 were evacuated in Guatemala. A total of 223 homes were damaged, including 11 severely. Twenty landslides were reported, resulting in damage to 13 roads. One hundred ninety-eight people sought shelter. Throughout Southwestern Mexico, rainfall amounts of 4 to 8 in (100 to 200 mm) were common, though the highest total observed was 17.91 in (455 mm) at Tres Picos, Chiapas. In that state, some streams overflowed their banks, resulting in minor damage. There, four minor injuries occurred when a house partially collapsed. Inland, in Xalapa, a high school student died and three others were wounded when a tree fell on campus. Overall, damage totaled at MXN$700 million (US$54.1 million), including MXN$689 million (US$53.2 million) to infrastructure.

Following the storm, aid was quickly provided to victims. Authorities authorized the delivery of 41,700 mats, and 15,000 L (3,300 imp gal; 4,000 US gal) of water.

== See also ==
- Other storms of the same name
- Tropical Storm Barbara (2007)
- Tropical Storm Andres (1997)
- Tropical Storm Beatriz (1993)
- Hurricane Carlotta (2012)
- Hurricane Barbara (2013)
