= Timeline of the 2007 Pacific hurricane season =

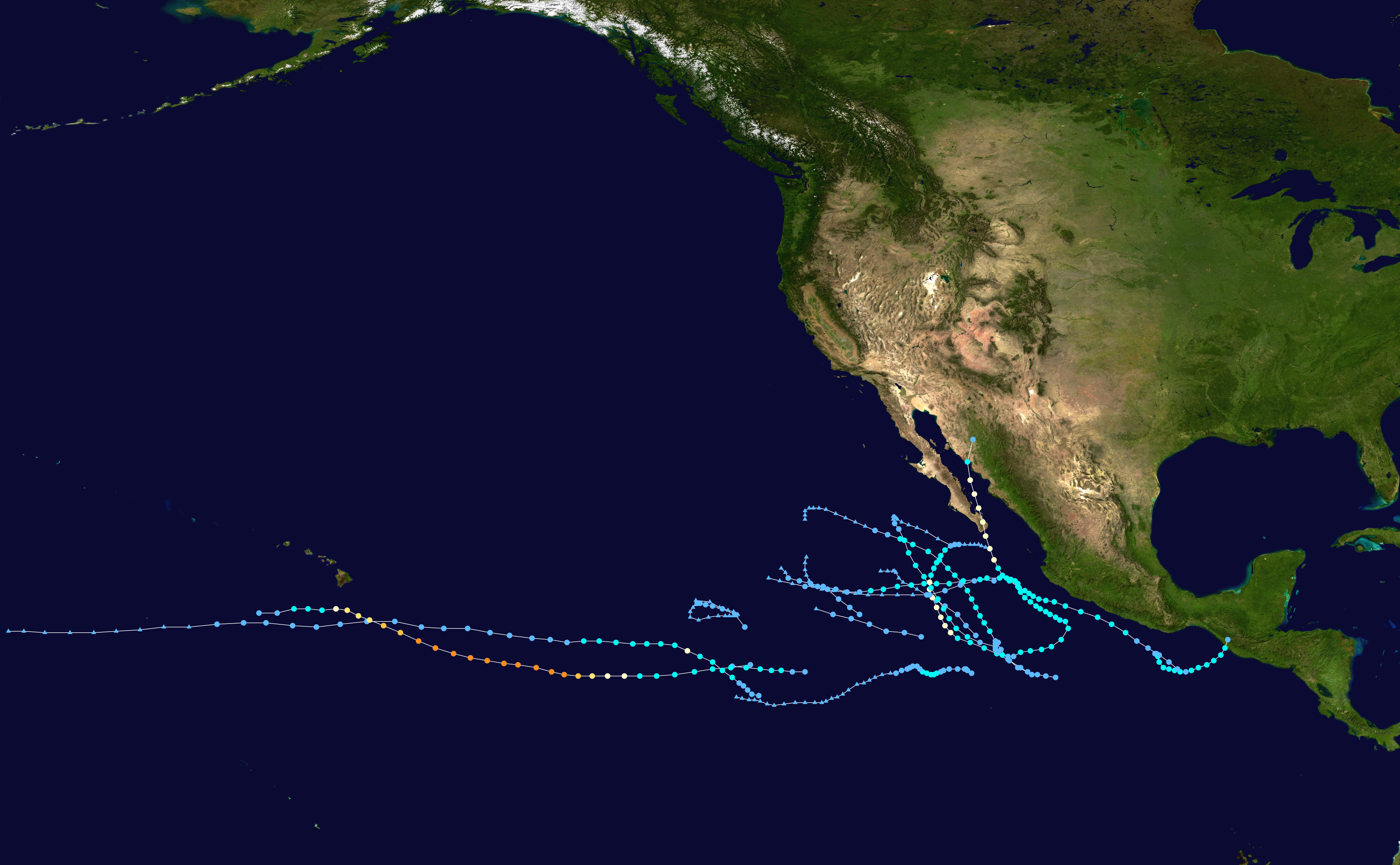
- Season summary map

Season boundaries
- First system formed: May 27, 2007
- Last system dissipated: October 23, 2007

Strongest system
- Name: Flossie
- Maximum winds: 140 mph (220 km/h) (1-minute sustained)
- Lowest pressure: 949 mbar (hPa; 28.02 inHg)

Longest lasting system
- Name: Kiko
- Duration: 8.75 days
Storm articles
- Tropical Storm Barbara (2007)
- Tropical Storm Dalila (2007)
- Hurricane Flossie (2007)
- Hurricane Henriette (2007)
- Tropical Storm Kiko (2007)

The 2007 Pacific hurricane season was an event in the annual cycle of tropical cyclone formation. This timeline documents all the storm formations, strengthening, weakening, landfalls, extratropical transitions, and dissipation. The timeline also includes information which was not operationally released, which is information from post-storm analysis by the National Hurricane Center.

The season officially started on May 15, 2007, in the eastern Pacific, designated as the area east of 140°W, and on June 1, 2007, in the central Pacific, which is between the International Date Line and 140°W, and lasted until November 30, 2007. These dates conventionally delimit the period of each year when most tropical cyclones form in the Pacific basin. The season began slowly; through the end of July, the seasonal Accumulated Cyclone Energy (ACE) was the third lowest since the geostationary satellite era began in the 1966 Pacific hurricane season. The inactivity continued through the next month, which was the third quietest August in terms of ACE since reliable records began in the basin during the 1971 Pacific hurricane season. In June, Tropical Storm Barbara caused $55 million (2007 USD) in crop damage to southeastern Mexico from heavy precipitation. In August, Hurricane Flossie formed in the eastern Pacific and crossed into the central Pacific; the hurricane threatened Hawaii but caused little damage. In early September, Hurricane Henriette dropped heavy rainfall in southwest Mexico, which caused nine fatalities and $25 million (2007 USD) in damage.

== Timeline of storms ==
=== May ===
May 15
- The Eastern Pacific hurricane season officially begins.

May 26
- 5:00 p.m. PDT (00:00 UTC May 27) – Tropical Depression One-E forms 345 mi (555 km) south of the tip of Baja California.

May 28
- 5:00 p.m. PDT (00:00 UTC May 29) – Tropical Depression One-E strengthens into Tropical Storm Alvin.

May 29
- 11:00 a.m. PDT (18:00 UTC) – Tropical Depression Two-E forms 115 mi (185 km) south-southeast of Puerto Escondido, Oaxaca, Mexico.
- 11:00 p.m. PDT (06:00 UTC May 30) – Tropical Storm Alvin weakens to a tropical depression.

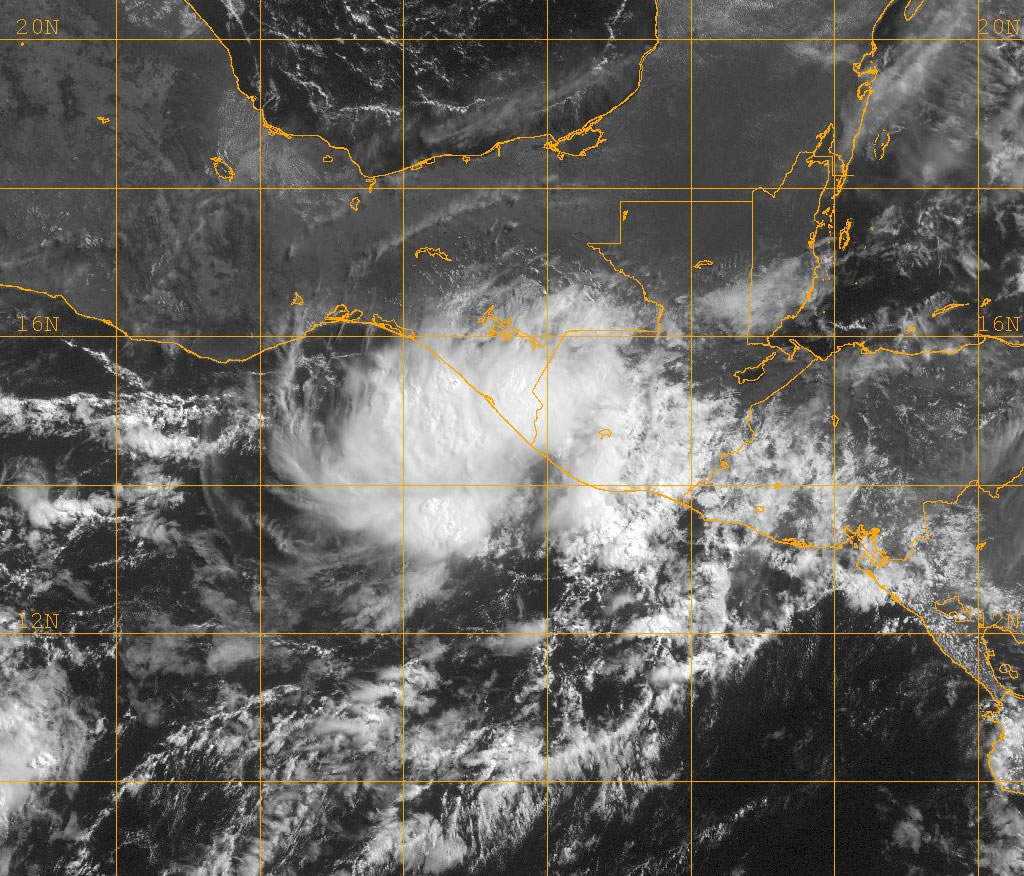
Tropical Storm Barbara near landfall

May 30
- 5:00 a.m. PDT (12:00 UTC) – Tropical Depression Two-E strengthens into Tropical Storm Barbara.

May 31
- 5:00 p.m. PDT (00:00 UTC June 1) – Tropical Depression Alvin degenerates into a remnant low.
- 5:00 p.m. PDT (00:00 UTC June 1) – Tropical Storm Barbara weakens to a tropical depression.
- 11:00 p.m. PDT (06:00 UTC June 1) – Tropical Depression Barbara restrengthens into a tropical storm.

=== June ===
June 2
- 6:00 a.m. PDT (13:00 UTC) – Tropical Storm Barbara makes landfall just northwest of the Mexico–Guatemala border with 50 mph (85 km/h) winds. (Note: The figures for maximum sustained winds and position estimates are rounded to the nearest 5 units (knots, miles, or kilometers), following the convention used in the National Hurricane Center's operational products for each storm. All other units are rounded to the nearest digit.)
- 11:00 a.m. PDT (18:00 UTC) – Tropical Storm Barbara weakens back to a tropical depression.
- 5:00 p.m. PDT (00:00 UTC June 3) – Tropical Depression Barbara dissipates.

June 11
- 5:00 a.m. PDT (12:00 UTC) – Tropical Depression Three-E forms 520 miles (835 km) south of the southern tip of the Baja California peninsula.

June 12
- 5:00 p.m. PDT (00:00 UTC June 13) – Tropical Depression Three-E degenerates into a remnant low.

=== July ===
July 9
- 11:00 a.m. PDT (18:00 UTC) – Tropical Depression Four-E forms several hundred miles southwest of Baja California.

July 10
- 11:00 p.m. PDT (06:00 UTC July 11) – Tropical Depression Four-E degenerates to a remnant low.

July 14
- 5:00 a.m. PDT (12:00 UTC) – Tropical Depression Five-E forms about 690 mi (1,110 km) south-southwest of the southern tip of Baja California.
- 5:00 a.m. PDT (12:00 UTC) – Tropical Depression Six-E forms about halfway between Mexico and the Hawaiian islands.

July 15
- 11:00 a.m. PDT (18:00 UTC) – Tropical Depression Six-E strengthens into Tropical Storm Cosme.
- 5:00 p.m. PDT (00:00 UTC July 16) – Tropical Depression Five-E degenerates into a remnant low.

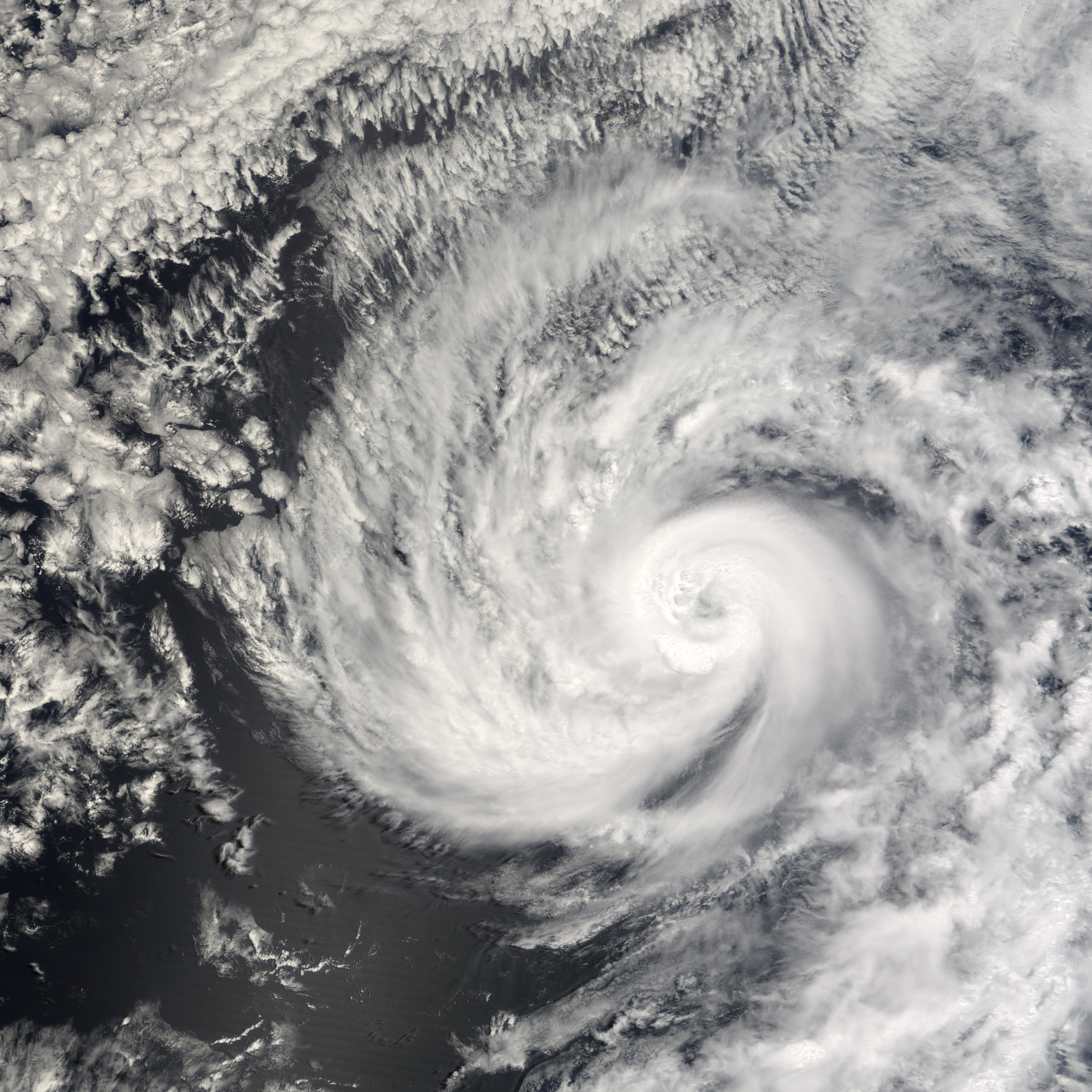
Hurricane Cosme near peak intensity

July 16
- 11:00 a.m. PDT (18:00 UTC) – Tropical Storm Cosme strengthens into Hurricane Cosme.
- 5:00 p.m. PDT (00:00 UTC July 17) – Hurricane Cosme is downgraded to a tropical storm.

July 18
- c. 11:00 a.m. PDT (8:00 a.m. HST, 18:00 UTC) – Tropical Storm Cosme is downgraded to a tropical depression as it crosses the 140°W boundary and moves into the Central Pacific Hurricane Center's area of responsibility.

July 21
- 5:00 p.m. PDT (00:00 UTC July 22) – Tropical Depression Seven-E forms south of Manzanillo.

July 22
- 8:00 a.m. HST (18:00 UTC) – The final advisory is issued on dissipating Tropical Depression Cosme.

July 23
- 5:00 p.m. PDT (00:00 UTC July 24) – Tropical Depression Seven-E strengthens into Tropical Storm Dalila.

July 26
- 11:00 p.m. PDT (06:00 UTC July 27) – Tropical Storm Dalila is downgraded to a tropical depression.

July 27
- 11:00 a.m. PDT (18:00 UTC) – Tropical Depression Dalila weakens into a low.

July 31
- 5:00 a.m. PDT (12:00 UTC) – Tropical Depression Eight-E forms 1,070 mi (1,715 km) southwest of the southern tip of Baja California.
- 5:00 p.m. PDT (01:00 UTC August 1) – Tropical Depression Eight-E strengthens into Tropical Storm Erick.

=== August ===
August 1
- 5:00 p.m. PDT (00:00 UTC August 2) – Tropical Storm Erick weakens into a tropical depression.
- 11:00 p.m. PDT (06:00 UTC August 2) – Tropical Depression Erick degenerates into a tropical wave.

August 8
- 11:00 a.m. PDT (18:00 UTC) – Tropical Depression Nine-E forms well to the southwest of Baja California.
- 5:00 p.m. PDT (00:00 UTC August 9) – Tropical Depression Nine-E is upgraded to Tropical Storm Flossie.

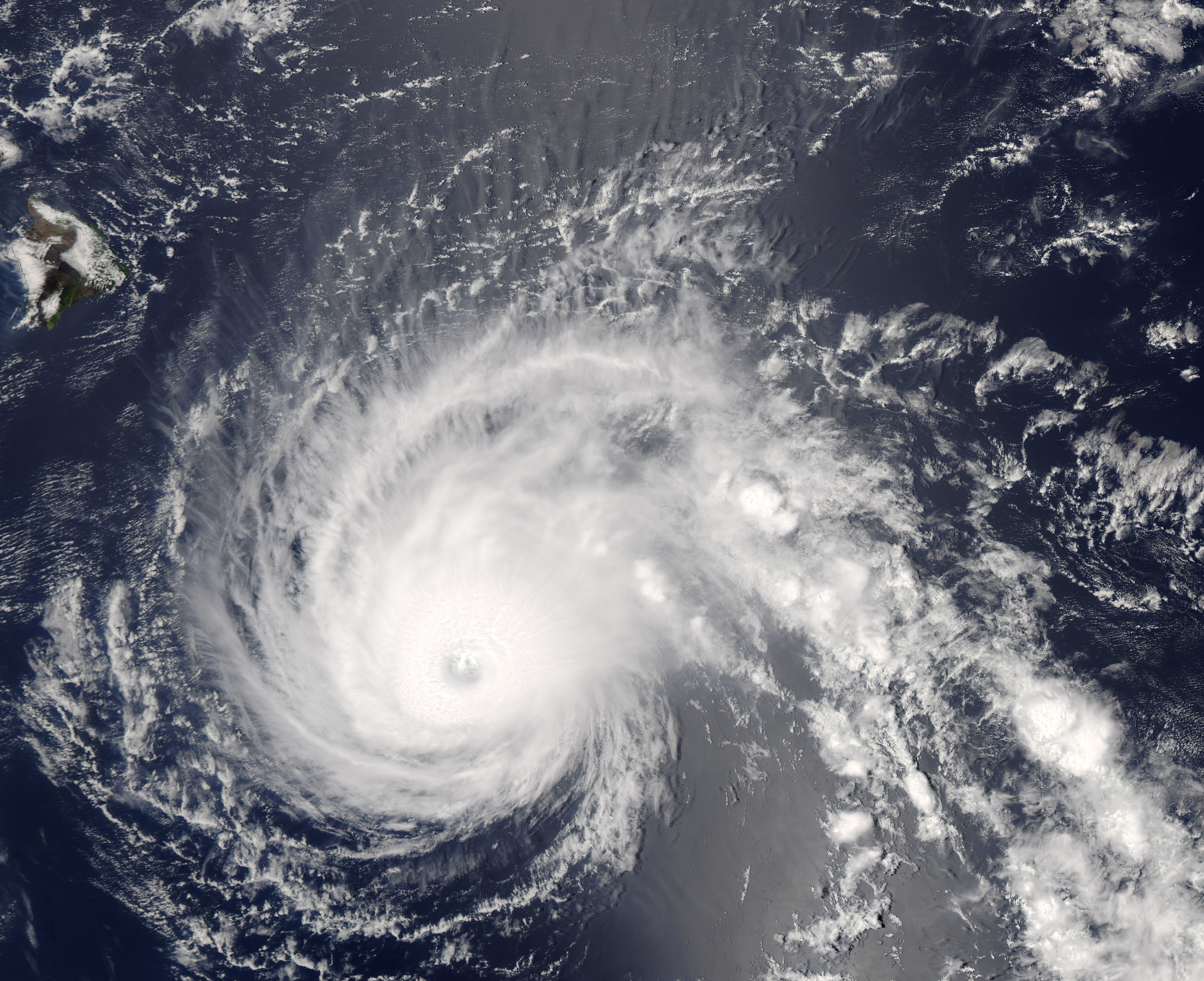
Hurricane Flossie approaching Hawaii

August 10
- 5:00 a.m. PDT (12:00 UTC) – Tropical Storm Flossie is upgraded to Hurricane Flossie.
- 11:00 p.m. PDT (06:00 UTC August 11) – Hurricane Flossie is upgraded to a Category 3 major hurricane, becoming the first major hurricane of the season.

August 11
- 5:00 a.m. PDT (12:00 UTC, 2 a.m. HST) – Hurricane Flossie is upgraded to a Category 4 hurricane, and crosses 140°W into the Central Pacific Hurricane Center's area of responsibility.

August 15
- 2:00 a.m. HST (12:00 UTC) – Hurricane Flossie is downgraded to a tropical storm.
- 8:00 p.m. HST (06:00 UTC August 16) – Tropical Storm Flossie is downgraded to a tropical depression.

August 16
- 8:00 a.m. HST (18:00 UTC) – Tropical Depression Flossie dissipates.

August 29
- 5:00 a.m. PDT (12:00 UTC) – Tropical Depression Ten-E forms west of Manzanillo, Mexico.
- 11:00 a.m. PDT (18:00 UTC) – Tropical Depression Ten-E is upgraded to Tropical Storm Gil.

August 29
- 11:00 p.m. PDT (06:00 UTC August 30) – Tropical Depression Eleven-E forms southeast of Acapulco, Mexico.

August 31
- 5:00 a.m. PDT (12:00 UTC) – Tropical Depression Eleven-E is upgraded to Tropical Storm Henriette.

August 31
- 5:00 p.m. PDT (00:00 UTC September 1) – Tropical Storm Gil is downgraded to a tropical depression.

=== September ===
September 2
- 11:00 a.m. PDT (18:00 UTC) – Tropical Depression Gil is downgraded to a remnant low.

September 3
- 11:00 p.m. PDT (06:00 UTC September 4) – Tropical Storm Henriette is upgraded to Hurricane Henriette.

September 4
- 2:00 p.m. PDT (21:00 UTC) – Hurricane Henriette makes landfall just east of San José del Cabo, Mexico with 80 mph (130 km/h) winds.

September 5
- 5:00 p.m. PDT (00:00 UTC September 6) – Hurricane Henriette is downgraded to a tropical storm.
- 5:00 p.m. PDT (00:00 UTC September 6) – Tropical Storm Henriette makes a second landfall near Guaymas, Mexico.

September 5
- 11:00 p.m. PDT (06:00 UTC September 6) – Tropical Storm Henriette is downgraded to a tropical depression.

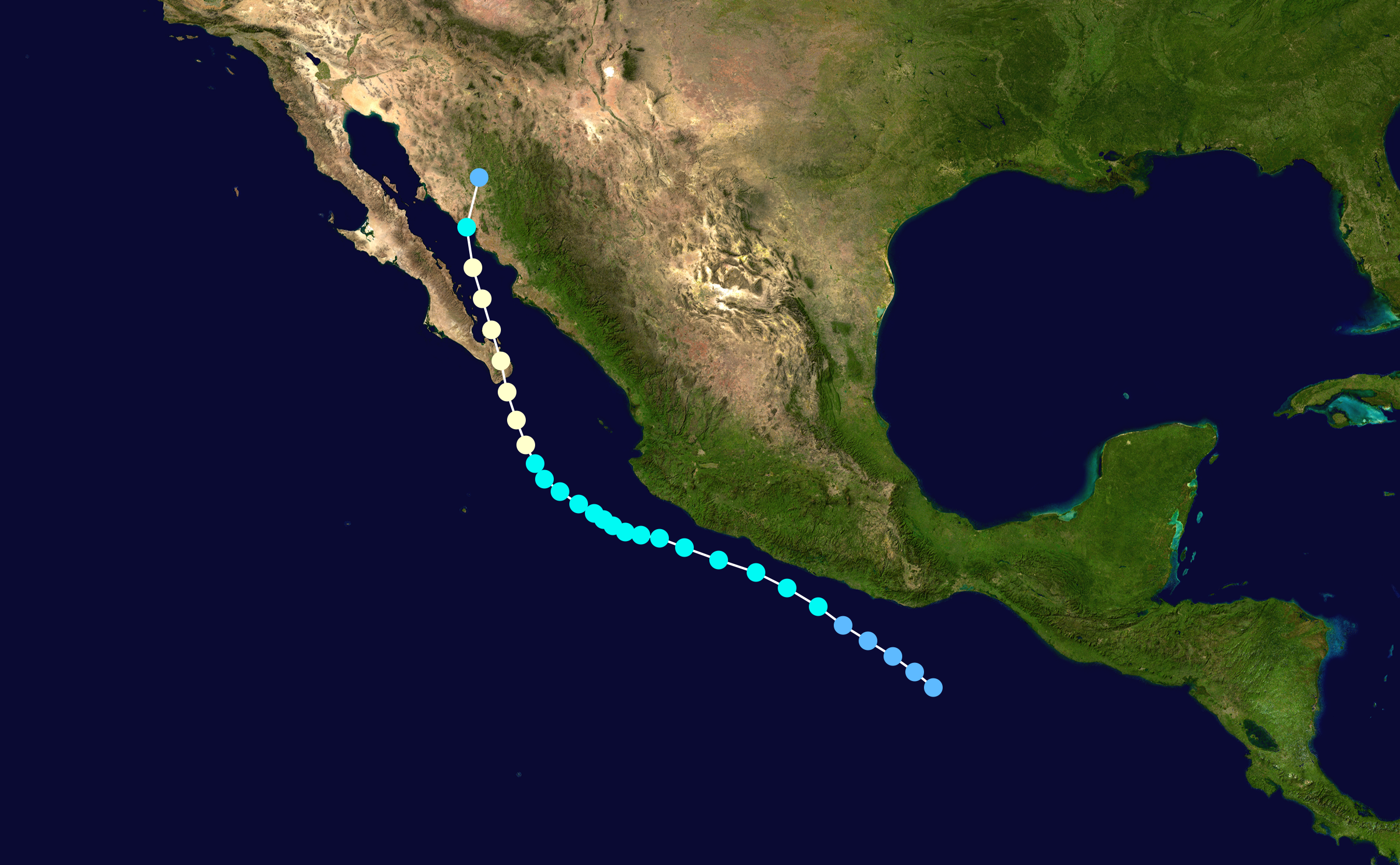
Hurricane Henriette track map

September 6
- 5:00 a.m. PDT (12:00 UTC) – Tropical Depression Henriette dissipates.

September 17
- 11:00 p.m. PDT (06:00 UTC September 18) – Tropical Depression Twelve-E forms south-southeast of the southern tip of Baja California.

September 18
- 5:00 p.m. PDT (00:00 UTC September 19) – Tropical Depression Twelve-E is upgraded to Tropical Storm Ivo.

September 18
- 11:00 p.m. PDT (06:00 UTC September 19) – Tropical Depression Thirteen-E forms west-southwest of the southern tip of Baja California.

September 19
- 5:00 p.m. PDT (00:00 UTC September 20) – Tropical Storm Ivo is upgraded to Hurricane Ivo.

September 20
- 5:00 p.m. PDT (00:00 UTC September 21) – Tropical Depression Thirteen-E is downgraded to a remnant low.

September 21
- 11:00 a.m. PDT (18:00 UTC) – Hurricane Ivo is downgraded to a tropical storm.

September 22
- 5:00 p.m. PDT (00:00 UTC September 23) – Tropical Storm Ivo is downgraded to a tropical depression.

September 23
- 11:00 a.m. PDT (18:00 UTC) – Tropical Depression Ivo is downgraded to a low.

September 28
- 5:00 p.m. PDT (00:00 UTC September 29) – Tropical Depression Fourteen-E forms west-southwest of Manzanillo.

September 29
- 5:00 a.m. PDT (12:00 UTC) – Tropical Depression Fourteen-E is upgraded to Tropical Storm Juliette.

=== October ===
October 1
- 5:00 p.m. PDT (00:00 UTC October 2) – Tropical Storm Juliette is downgraded to a tropical depression.

October 2
- 5:00 a.m. PDT (12:00 UTC) – Tropical Depression Juliette is downgraded to a remnant low.

October 14
- 5:00 p.m. PDT (00:00 UTC October 15) – Tropical Depression Fifteen-E forms southwest of Manzanillo.

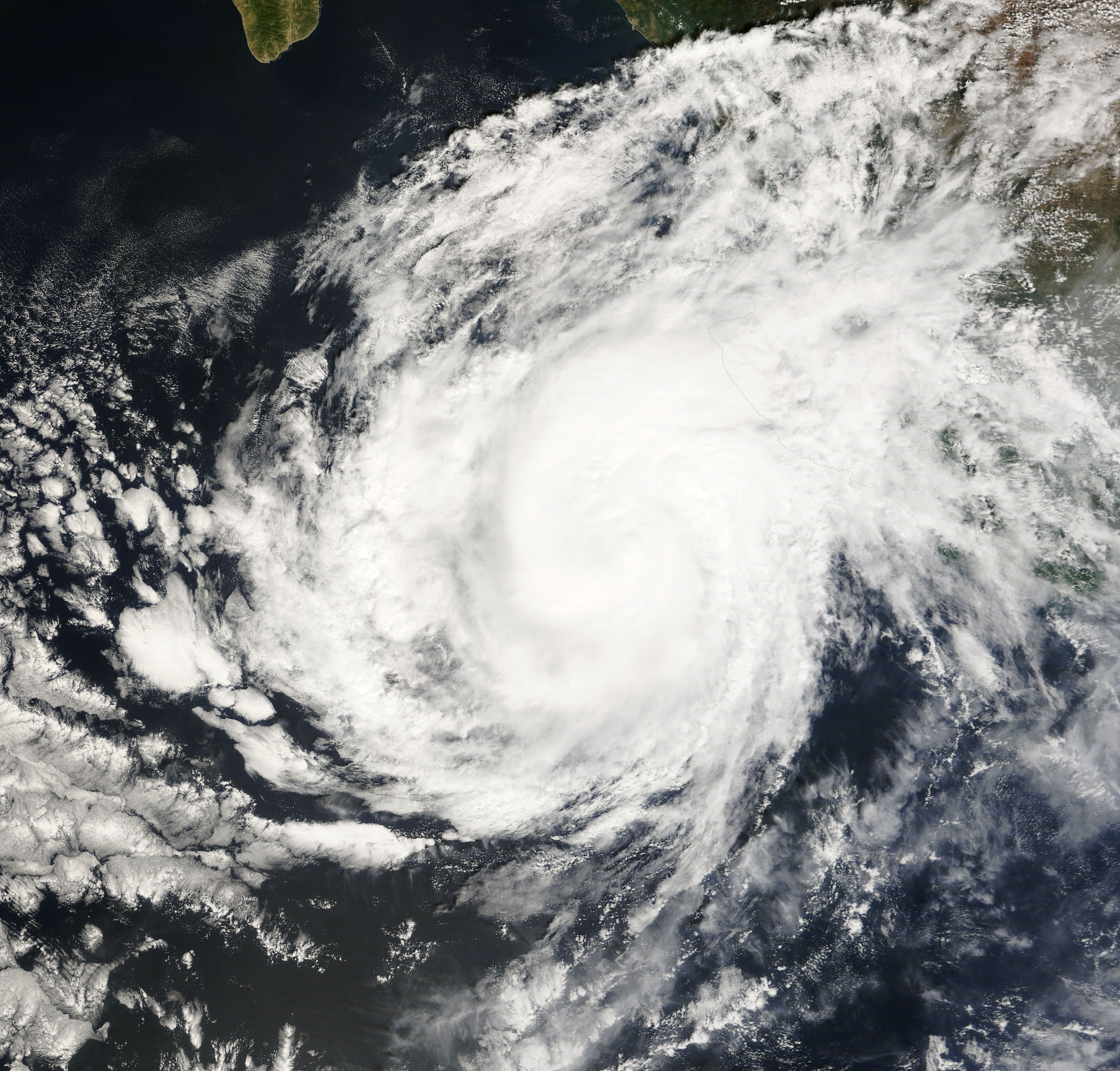
Tropical Storm Kiko on October 20

October 16
- 5:00 a.m. PDT (12:00 UTC) – Tropical Depression Fifteen-E is upgraded to Tropical Storm Kiko.
- 11:00 a.m. PDT (18:00 UTC) – Tropical Storm Kiko is downgraded to a tropical depression.

October 16
- 11:00 p.m. PDT (06:00 UTC October 17) – Tropical Depression Kiko restrengthens into a tropical storm.

October 22
- 5:00 p.m. PDT (00:00 UTC October 23) – Tropical Storm Kiko is downgraded to a tropical depression.

October 23
- 5:00 p.m. PDT (00:00 UTC October 24) – Tropical Depression Kiko is downgraded to a remnant low.

=== November ===
November 30
- The Eastern Pacific hurricane season officially ends.

== See also ==
- Timeline of the 2007 Atlantic hurricane season
- Timeline of the 2007 Pacific typhoon season
- Timeline of the 2007 North Indian Ocean cyclone season
- Timeline of the 2007–08 South-West Indian Ocean cyclone season
- Timeline of the 2007–08 South Pacific cyclone season
- Timeline of the 2007–08 Australian region cyclone season
