= List of storms named Barbara =

The name Barbara has been used for fourteen tropical cyclones worldwide: two in the Atlantic Ocean, eight in the Eastern Pacific Ocean, one in the South Pacific Ocean, one in the Western Pacific Ocean, and two in the South-West Indian Ocean. It has also been used to name three extratropical cyclones in Europe.

In the Atlantic:

- Hurricane Barbara (1953), Category 1 hurricane that moved up the U.S. east coast.
- Tropical Storm Barbara (1954), made landfall near Vermilion Bay, Louisiana.

in the Eastern Pacific:

- Hurricane Barbara (1983), a Category 4 hurricane that stayed far from land.
- Hurricane Barbara (1989), a Category 1 hurricane that did not strike land.
- Hurricane Barbara (1995), strong Category 4 that remained away from land.
- Tropical Storm Barbara (2001), passed to the northeast of Hawaii.
- Tropical Storm Barbara (2007), made landfall near the Guatemala–Mexico border.
- Hurricane Barbara (2013), large Category 1 hurricane that made landfall on the Isthmus of Tehuantepec in Mexico.
- Hurricane Barbara (2019), powerful Category 4 hurricane that did not affect land.
- Hurricane Barbara (2025), weak Category 1 hurricane that paralleled the Mexican coast.

In the South Pacific:

- Cyclone Barbara (1967)

In the Western Pacific:

- Typhoon Barbara (1946), made landfall in the Philippines.

In the South-West Indian:

- Tropical Storm Barbara (1960), remained far from land.
- Tropical Storm Barbara (1975), made landfall in Madagascar twice.

In Europe:

- Storm Barbara (2016), caused minor damage in Northern Ireland and Wales.
- Storm Barbara (2023), storm that affected the eastern Mediterranean after the 2023 Turkey–Syria earthquake.
- Storm Barbara (2025), storm the affected Italy and the Balkans in October.

== See also ==
- Hurricane Neddy, a season eight episode of The Simpsons television series which featured a fictional Hurricane Barbara.
