= Tropical Storm Kiko (2007) =

Pacific tropical cyclone

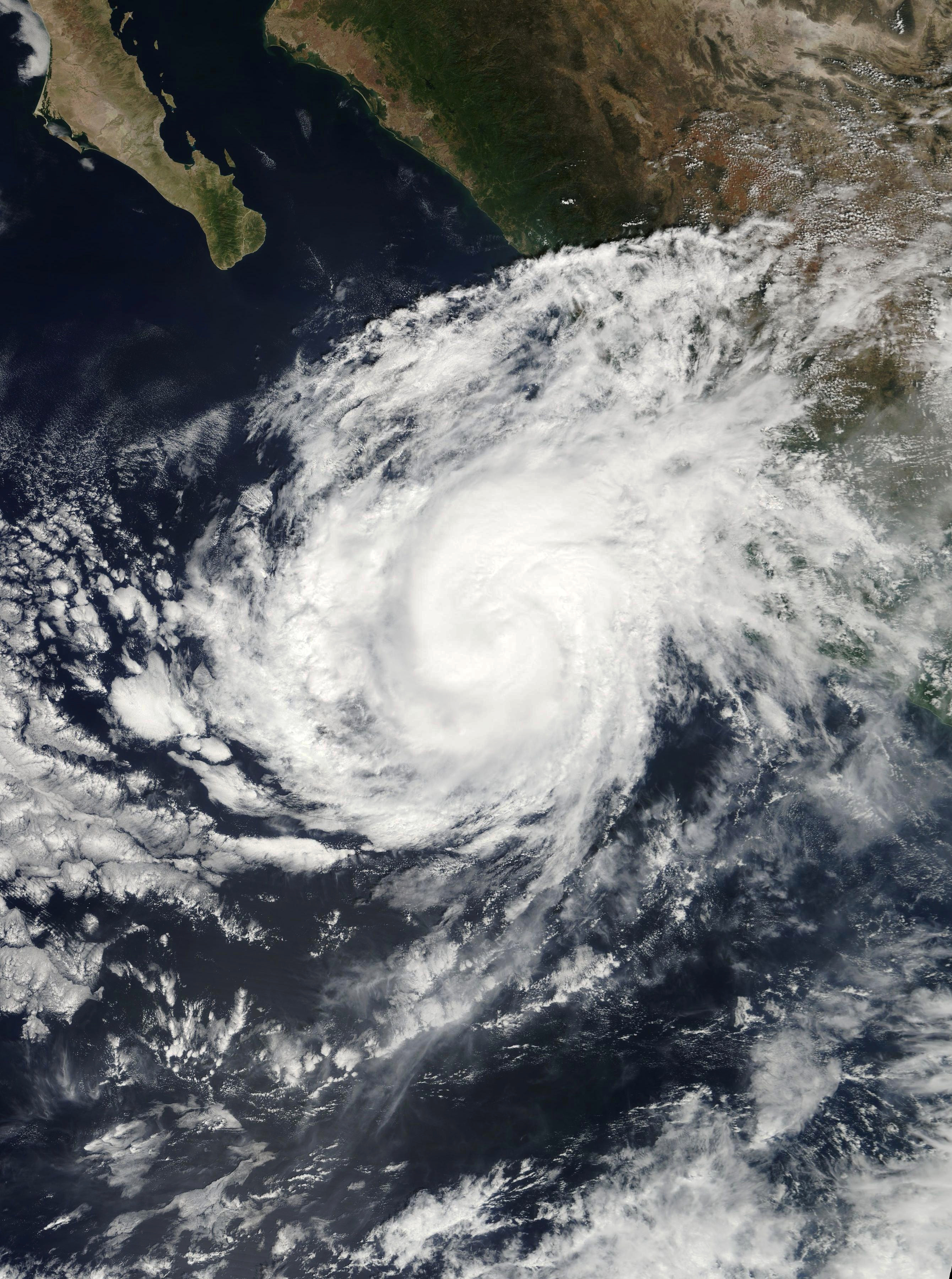
- Tropical Storm Kiko at peak intensity off of the coast of Mexico on October 20

Meteorological history
- Formed: October 15, 2007
- Dissipated: October 23, 2007

Tropical storm
- 1-minute sustained (SSHWS/NWS)
- Highest winds: 70 mph (110 km/h)
- Lowest pressure: 991 mbar (hPa); 29.26 inHg

Overall effects
- Fatalities: 15 direct
- Missing: 9
- Damage: $1.08 million (2007 USD)
- Areas affected: Western Mexico
- IBTrACS
- Part of the 2007 Pacific hurricane season

Tropical Storm Kiko was a strong tropical storm that capsized a boat off the western coast of Mexico, killing at least 15 people. The 15th and final tropical cyclone of the 2007 Pacific hurricane season, Kiko developed out of a tropical wave that formed off the coast of Africa on September 26 and traversed the Atlantic. The wave crossed over Central America and entered the Pacific Ocean on October 8, where it spawned Tropical Depression 15-E on October 15. The depression drifted to the south over the next day before briefly being declared Tropical Storm Kiko. It subsequently weakened into a tropical depression, but later reattained tropical storm intensity. By October 18, Kiko was forecast to make landfall along the western Mexican coastline as a moderate tropical storm. However, the cyclone turned to the west and reached its peak intensity of 70 mph (110 km/h) on October 20. The tropical storm slowly weakened to a remnant low-pressure area by October 24 and completely dissipated on October 27 without making landfall.

== Meteorological history ==
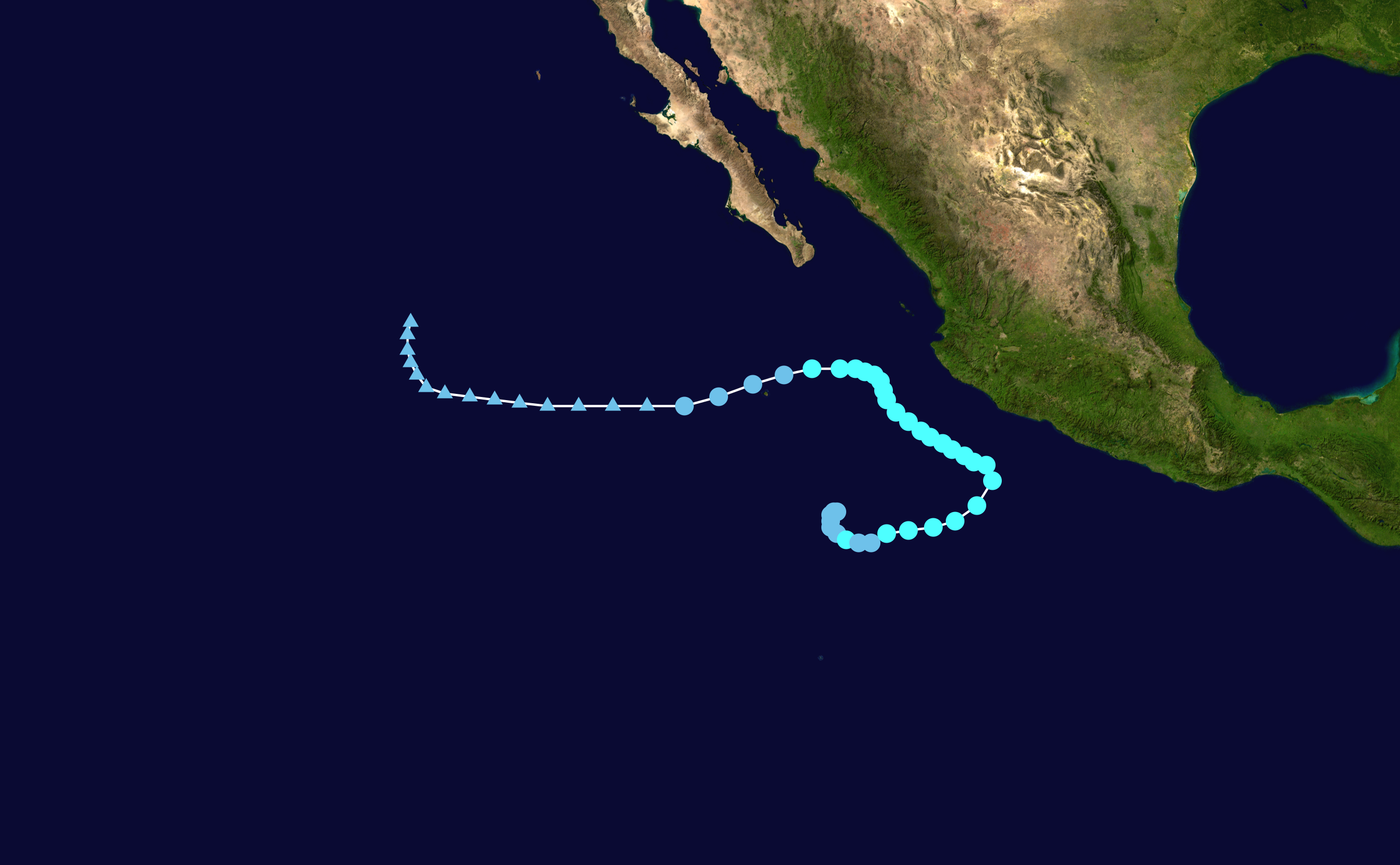
Map plotting the storm's track and intensity, according to the Saffir–Simpson scale Map key Saffir–Simpson scale Tropical depression (≤38 mph, ≤62 km/h) Tropical storm (39–73 mph, 63–118 km/h) Category 1 (74–95 mph, 119–153 km/h) Category 2 (96–110 mph, 154–177 km/h) Category 3 (111–129 mph, 178–208 km/h) Category 4 (130–156 mph, 209–251 km/h) Category 5 (≥157 mph, ≥252 km/h) Unknown Storm type Tropical cyclone Subtropical cyclone Extratropical cyclone, remnant low, tropical disturbance, or monsoon depression

A tropical wave exited the western coast of Africa on September 26, quickly spawning an area of low pressure. Upon the formation of the low, the wave split into two pieces and a second area of low pressure developed along the southern portion of the wave as it traveled west. The northern low quickly developed, spawning Tropical Depression Fourteen on September 28. The southern low attached to the wave failed to develop and moved away from the intensifying tropical depression. It continued through the Atlantic, entering the Pacific Ocean, after crossing Central America, on October 8. A broad area of low pressure accompanied by showers and thunderstorms developed along the wave around 275 miles (443 kilometres) south of Acapulco, Mexico. However, the low remained disorganized because of strong upper-level winds. On October 13, the low became better organized due to a relaxation in the shear. The low developed enough convection late on October 14 to be declared Tropical Depression Fifteen-E while located about 435 mi (700 km) southwest of Colima, Mexico.

The depression was embedded within a broad, low-level cyclone with weak steering currents that caused Fifteen-E to drift southward for the next 30 hours. On October 16, strong easterly wind shear exposed the center of the depression from shower and thunderstorm activity. However, a curving convective band developed around the system, and satellites detected winds of 40 mph (64 km/h). This prompted the National Hurricane Center to upgrade the depression to Tropical Storm Kiko as it drifted about 430 mi (690 km) southwest of Manzanillo, Mexico. The intensification was short-lived, and Kiko was downgraded to a tropical depression six hours later when the center separated from diminishing convection. On October 17, the storm was upgraded to a tropical storm when the low became associated with deep convection. The center remained poorly defined, and winds of tropical storm-force blew only in Kiko's southwest quadrant. Over the next few days, Kiko moved slowly towards the east-northeast as a minimal tropical storm and was forecast to either brush land or to make landfall along the Mexican coast on October 19 or October 20. However, early on October 19, Kiko turned to the northwest when a high-pressure ridge developed over Mexico. Forecasters predicted that the storm would become a strong Category 1 hurricane as it turned away from Mexico and headed to sea.

As the ridge pushed the storm away from the coast, weaker wind shear and warm sea-surface temperatures allowed Kiko to gradually intensify. The storm reached its peak intensity of 70 mph (110 km/h) 991 mbar (hPa; 29.28 inHg) late on October 20 while located around 175 mi (282 km) west-southwest of Manzanillo, Mexico. As it moved away from the coast, an eye began to form. Shortly thereafter, shear increased and began to separate the low from the deep convection. By the afternoon of October 21, the storm was poorly organized and the center was partially exposed. At this time, the weakening system had winds sustained at 50 mph (80 km/h). Early on October 22, a brief burst in showers and thunderstorms allowed the storm to maintain its intensity. That evening, Kiko was downgraded to a tropical depression as strong wind shear removed convection from the storm's center and exposed the low. As the depression moved over a dryer and more hostile area, two inhibiting factors for development of tropical cyclones, it slowly weakened. It lost almost all convection and degenerated to a remnant low-pressure area on October 23, and the National Hurricane Center issued its final advisory that night. The remnant low moved west before dissipating on October 27 over open waters.

== Preparations and impact ==
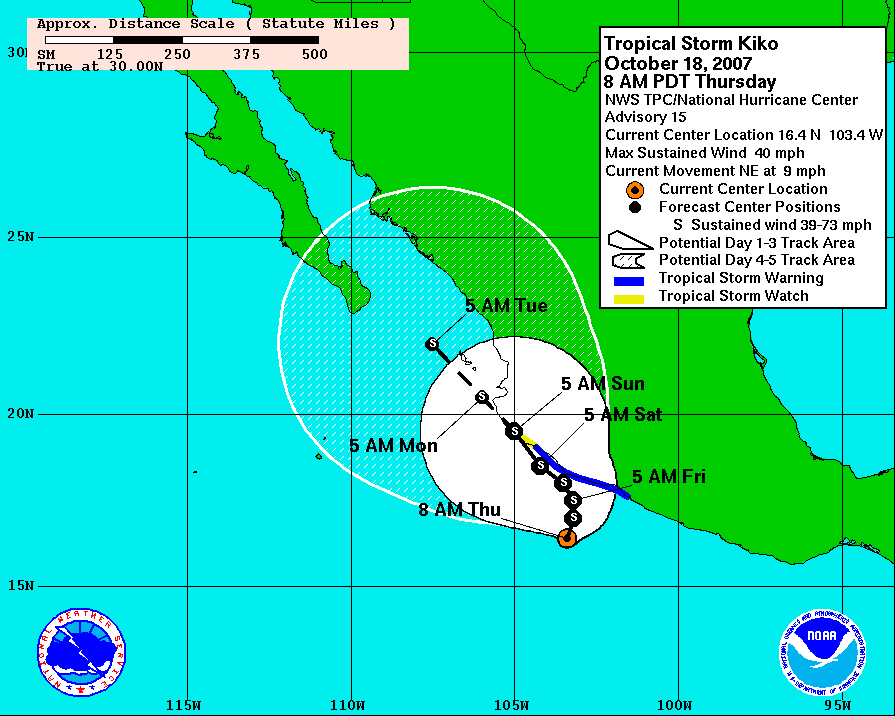
Tropical Storm Kiko's projected path on October 18, showing the storm striking the Mexican coast

On October 18, a tropical storm warning was issued along the Mexican coastline from Zihuatanejo, Guerrero to Manzanillo, Colima, and a tropical storm watch extended northward to La Fortuna, Mexico, as Kiko was forecast to make landfall in that region on October 21. Above-normal tides and dangerous waves were expected along the coast. Rainfall totals of 4 to 7 in (100 to 180 mm) were possible over southwestern Mexico with isolated totals reaching 10 in (250 mm). As a precaution, port captains shut down shipping and advised residents to avoid low-lying areas that might flood. Civil Defense advised these residents to move to temporary shelters and tourists were told to stay indoors. Emergency procedures were on standby in case conditions became more threatening.

As the storm neared land, a ridge over Mexico prevented Kiko from coming ashore, resulting in far less damage than forecast. As Kiko traveled parallel to the coast, heavy rain affected the region for two days. In Kiko's rough seas off the coast of Mexico, a ship capsized with twenty-five passengers and crew. Continued effects from Kiko hampered rescue efforts, forcing officials to call off the rescue attempt. Authorities searched the beaches of San Francisco Ixhuatán and San Francisco del Mar for any signs of the ship. Only two people survived; fifteen bodies were recovered, and nine passengers were never found.

Remnant moisture from Kiko fueled severe thunderstorms across California. Strong winds, heavy rain, and hail were reported. Flooding trapped numerous vehicles and caused the roof of a factory in Fresno to collapse. Downed power lines left 16,000 customers without electricity. At least eight fallen trees were reported. At Lake Kaweah, strong winds damaged 200 boats. Two homes in Tulare County were damaged. Damage statewide totaled to US$1.08 million (2007 USD).

== See also ==
- Other storms of the same name
- List of Eastern Pacific tropical storms
- Timeline of the 2007 Pacific hurricane season
