= Hurricane Agatha =

Category 2 Pacific hurricane in 2022

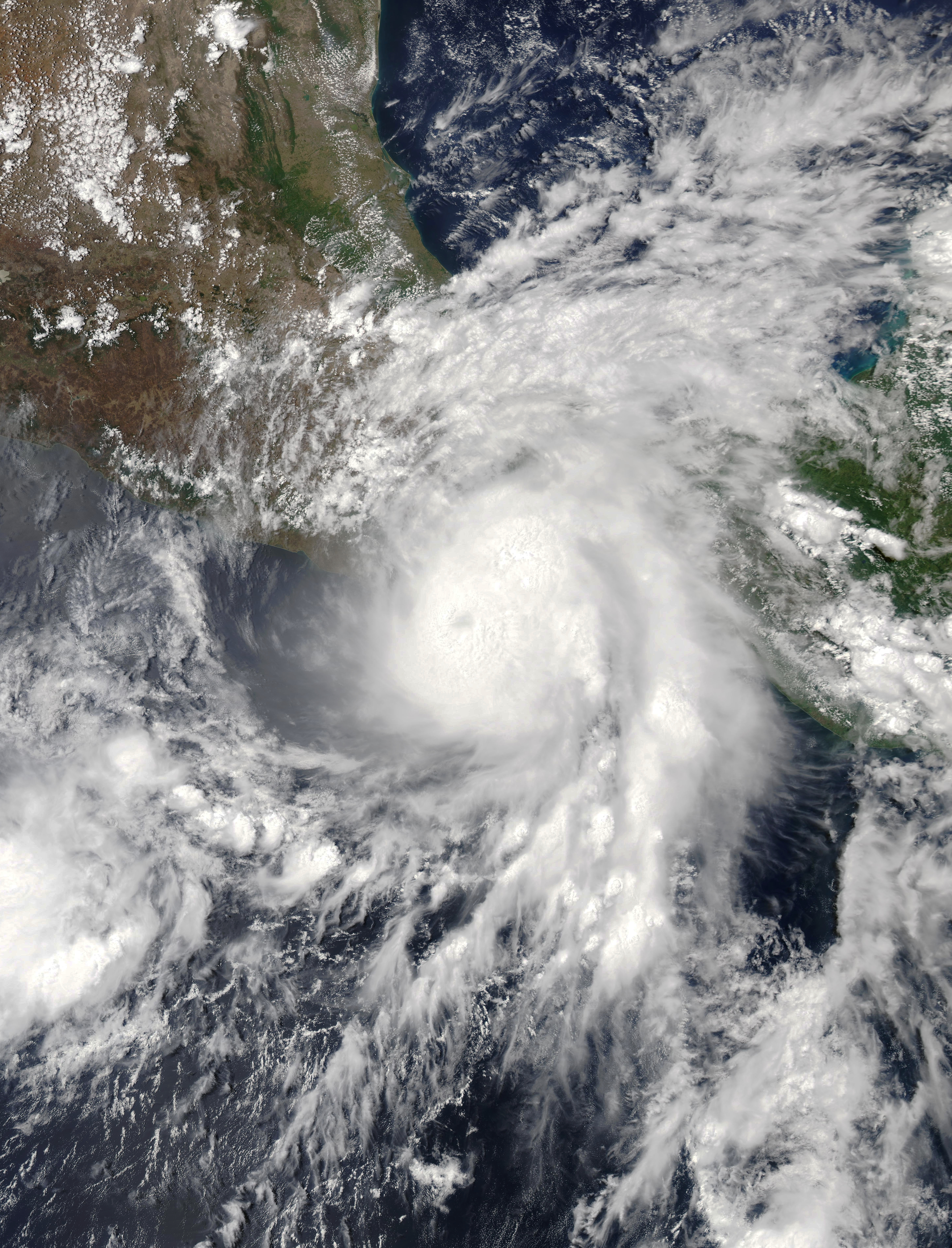
- Agatha at peak intensity nearing landfall in Oaxaca on May 30

Meteorological history
- Formed: May 28, 2022
- Remnant low: May 31, 2022
- Dissipated: June 1, 2022

Category 2 hurricane
- 1-minute sustained (SSHWS/NWS)
- Highest winds: 110 mph (175 km/h)
- Lowest pressure: 964 mbar (hPa); 28.47 inHg

Overall effects
- Fatalities: 9
- Missing: 6
- Damage: $327 million (2022 USD)
- Areas affected: Southern Mexico
- IBTrACS /
- Part of the 2022 Pacific hurricane season

Hurricane Agatha was the strongest hurricane to make landfall along the Pacific coast of Mexico in the month of May since records began in 1949. The first named storm and the first hurricane of the 2022 Pacific hurricane season, Agatha originated from a surface trough south of the Gulf of Tehuantepec. It steadily organized into a tropical depression early on May 28 and within hours intensified into Tropical Storm Agatha. Amid favorable environmental conditions, the cyclone underwent rapid intensification on May 29, strengthening into a Category 2 hurricane and reaching peak winds of 110 mph (180 km/h). Though the storm moved west-northwest early on, it curved toward the northeast in response to weakening high pressure over Mexico. On the afternoon of May 30, the hurricane made landfall just west of Puerto Ángel, Oaxaca, with slightly weaker winds of 105 mph (169 km/h).

Agatha weakened rapidly as it moved inland, and soon dissipated. Heavy rain brought by the storm triggered landslides and flash flooding, killing at least 9 and left 6 missing in Oaxaca. Total damage across the state reached 6.39 billion pesos (US$327 million).

== Meteorological history ==
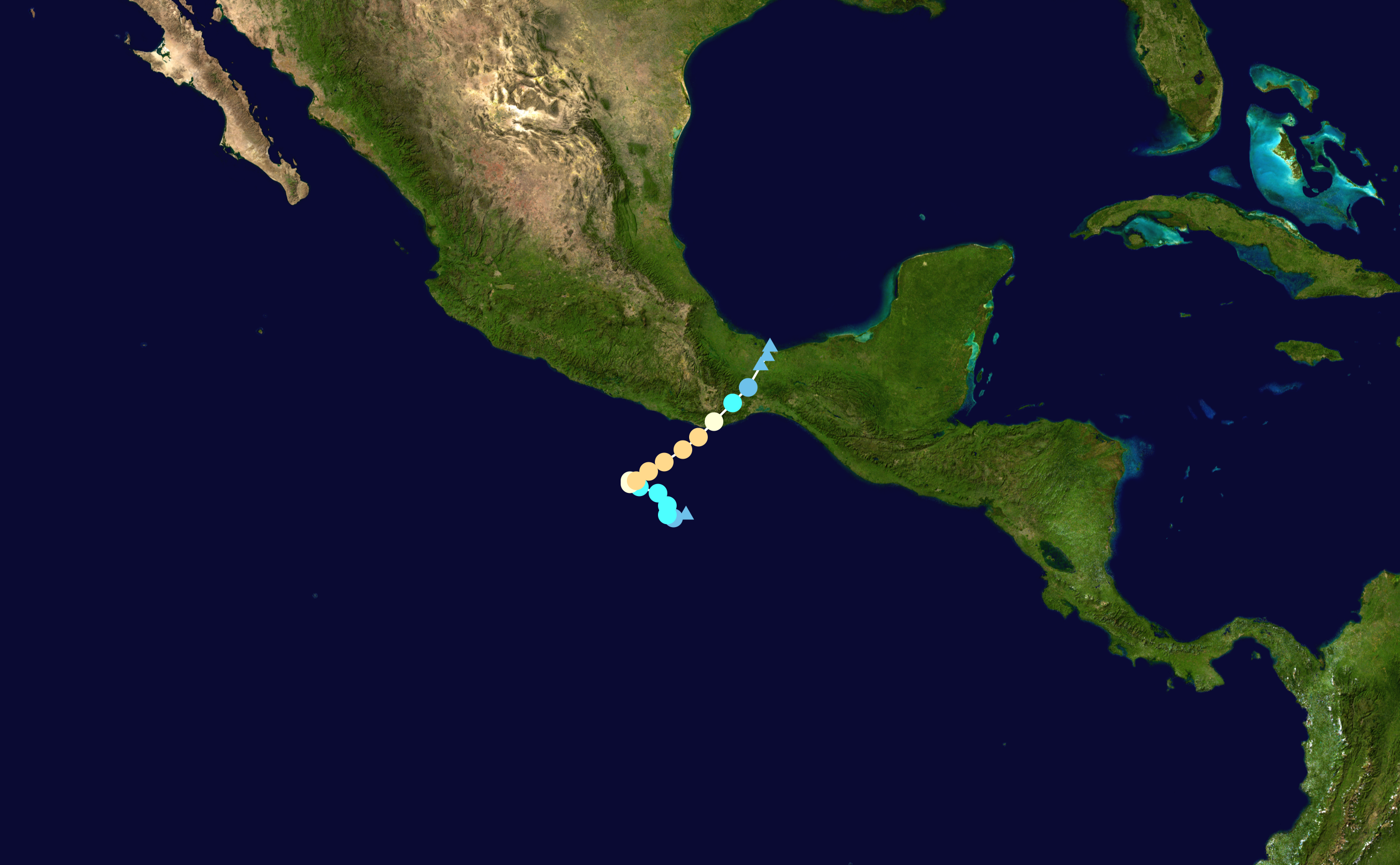
Map plotting the storm's track and intensity, according to the Saffir–Simpson scale Map key Saffir–Simpson scale Tropical depression (≤38 mph, ≤62 km/h) Tropical storm (39–73 mph, 63–118 km/h) Category 1 (74–95 mph, 119–153 km/h) Category 2 (96–110 mph, 154–177 km/h) Category 3 (111–129 mph, 178–208 km/h) Category 4 (130–156 mph, 209–251 km/h) Category 5 (≥157 mph, ≥252 km/h) Unknown Storm type Tropical cyclone Subtropical cyclone Extratropical cyclone, remnant low, tropical disturbance, or monsoon depression

On May 22, The National Hurricane Center (NHC) began monitoring a low-pressure area located several hundred miles offshore southwest of the coast of Mexico. By 06:00 UTC on May 26, the disturbance's showers and thunderstorms began to show some signs of organization while located a few hundred miles south of the Gulf of Tehuantepec. At 23:16 UTC on May 26, visible satellite imagery indicated that a broad low pressure system had formed in association with the disturbed weather. By 03:00 UTC on May 28, the system had achieved sufficient convective organization to be designated as Tropical Depression One-E, the first depression of the 2022 Eastern Pacific hurricane season. The depression strengthened into Tropical Storm Agatha around 09:00 UTC that same day, while centered about 220 mi (350 km) south-southwest of Puerto Ángel, Oaxaca. Agatha continued to organize based on satellite imagery, with curved bands forming.

Later, a burst of convection formed near the center, and microwave imagery revealed that Agatha had improved its convective structure and better aligned its low-level circulation. The NHC assessed the system to have strengthened into a Category 1 hurricane on the Saffir–Simpson scale by 12:00 UTC on May 29. Agatha was located over warm sea surface temperature of near 86 °F (30 °C) with very low wind shear and began to intensify rapidly. At 21:00 UTC, Agatha was upgraded to a Category 2 system, as Hurricane Hunter aircraft found peak winds of 110 mph (180 km/h) and a minimum barometric pressure of 964 millibars (28.5 inHg), while retaining its intensity.

Agatha's rapid intensification appeared to level off in the early hours of May 30, and the hurricane began an anticipated turn to the northeast. Later that day, as the core of the system approached the coast of Mexico, the satellite presentation of the storm displayed hints of an eye occasionally appearing within the central dense overcast, and convection remained quite deep and symmetric around the center. Agatha made landfall near Puerto Ángel, Oaxaca, at 21:00 UTC on May 30, with sustained winds of 105 mph (169 km/h), becoming the strongest landfalling Pacific hurricane on record so early in the year. Inland, the system moved toward the northeast and weakened to a Category 1 hurricane by 00:00 UTC on May 31. Agatha weakened to a tropical storm three hours later, and then to a tropical depression by 12:00 UTC that same day. Soon thereafter, Agatha degenerated into a remnant low over the mountainous terrain of southern Mexico. The low then dissipated early on June 1, inland, near the northern coast of the Isthmus of Tehuantepec. The remnant low was absorbed into the disorganized disturbance complex that eventually became Tropical Storm Alex in the Atlantic Basin.

== Preparations and impact ==
Infographic of Hurricane Agatha on May 30

The Mexican government issued a hurricane warning on May 28 for areas along the Oaxaca coast between Salina Cruz and Lagunas de Chacahua, with hurricane watches and tropical storm watches and warnings posted east and west of the warning area. The governments of the states of Oaxaca and Guerrero issued warnings; in Oaxaca, state officials issued warnings to seaside areas and suspended school activities, while ports in Guerrero were closed. Ports were also closed to smaller vessels in Acapulco, Huatulco, Puerto Ángel, and Puerto Escondido. A total of 118 emergency medical care facilities and 215 temporary shelters with capacity for as many as 27,735 people were established throughout Oaxaca. Fourteen shelters were opened in San Pedro Pochutla, and 203 shelters were set up in Puerto Escondido; restaurants and beaches in the city were also closed.

On the evening of May 29, intense rainfall hit Acapulco, blocking highways and amassing sea debris on the beaches. A man was trapped in a sewage and was rescued by firefighters and the Red Cross. According to a statement by Governor Alejandro Murat, 9 people were killed by the storm in Oaxaca and a further 6 people were missing. All of these fatalities were due to freshwater flooding in the Sierra Madre del Sur, with some people swept away by overflowing rivers or buried by mudslides. According to CENAPRED, total damage from the hurricane valued at 6.39 billion pesos (US$327 million). Coastal regions were also heavily impacted. Bridges collapsed on thoroughfares leading to San Pedro Pochutla and Huatulco. Power outages affected 46,563 people in Oaxaca and another 23,519 in neighboring Veracruz according to the Federal Electricity Commission. The Government of Mexico allocated 6.51 billion pesos (US$333 million) in aid for Oaxaca. The first aid of 653 million pesos (US$33.4 million) were distributed to restore the electric power service, deliver food and water, and purchase goods for the emergency.

== See also ==
- Weather of 2022
- Tropical cyclones in 2022
- List of Category 2 Pacific hurricanes
- Hurricane Pauline (1997) – a Category 4 hurricane that made landfall at a similar location as Agatha
- Hurricane Beatriz (2011) – a Category 1 hurricane that brushed the western coast of Mexico
- Hurricane Carlotta (2012) – a Category 2 hurricane that made landfall at a similar location as Agatha
- Hurricane Barbara (2013) – a Category 1 hurricane that took a similar path to Agatha
- Tropical Storm Alex (2022) - formed in part from the mid-level remnants of Agatha
