= Tropical Storm Barbara (2007) =

Pacific tropical storm in 2007

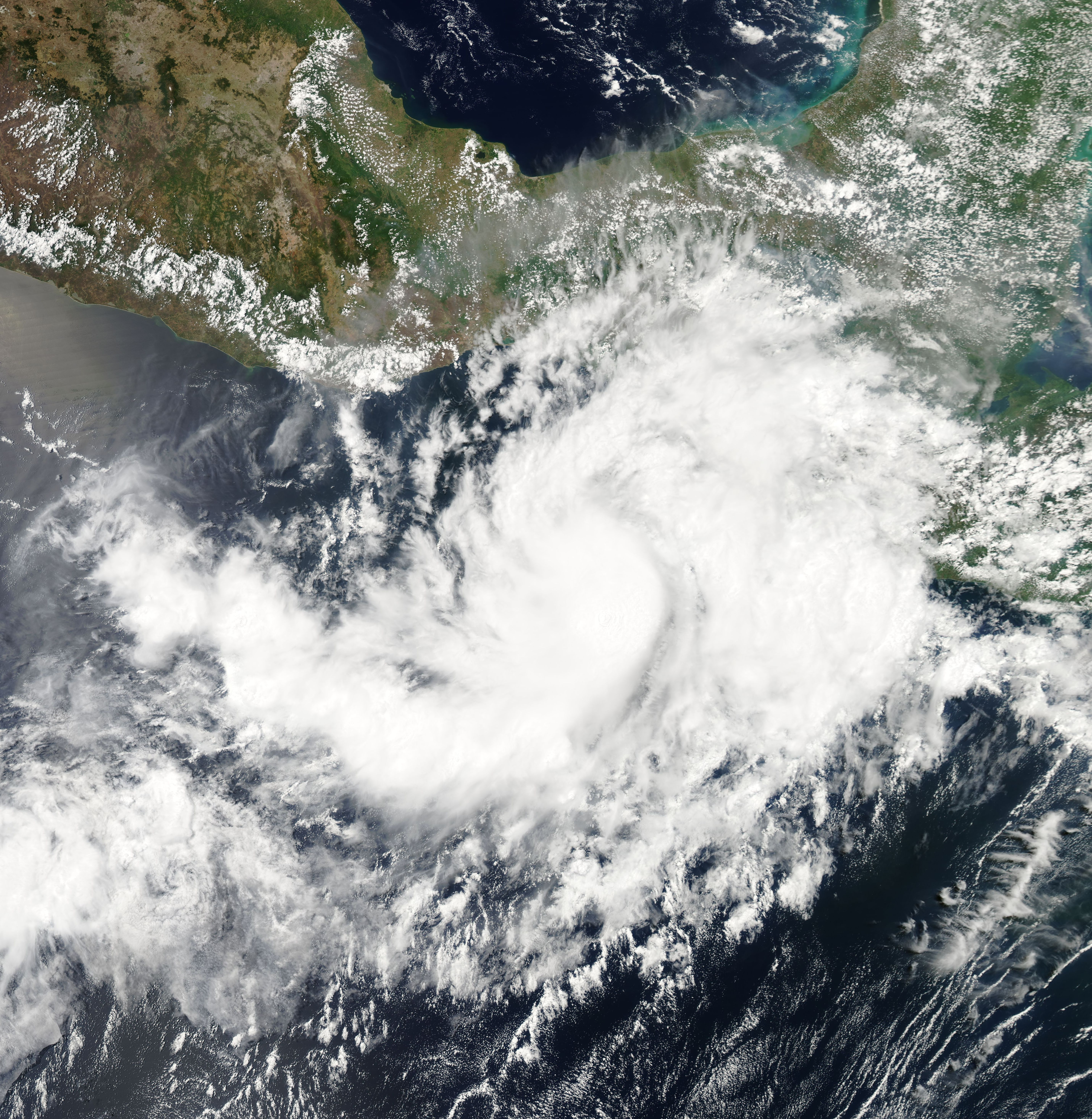
- Tropical Storm Barbara at peak intensity on June 1

Meteorological history
- Formed: May 29, 2007
- Dissipated: June 2, 2007

Tropical storm
- 1-minute sustained (SSHWS/NWS)
- Highest winds: 50 mph (85 km/h)
- Lowest pressure: 1000 mbar (hPa); 29.53 inHg

Overall effects
- Fatalities: 4 total
- Damage: $55 million (2007 USD)
- Areas affected: Southwestern Mexico, Guatemala, El Salvador
- IBTrACS
- Part of the 2007 Pacific hurricane season

Tropical Storm Barbara was the first tropical cyclone to make landfall during the 2007 Pacific hurricane season. The second storm of the season, Barbara developed from a small low-pressure area on May 29 about 235 miles (380 km) southeast of Acapulco, Mexico. The system drifted southward before turning to a steadily eastward motion, and quickly intensified into a tropical storm. Increased wind shear weakened Barbara, though it re-organized to attain peak winds of 50 mph (80 km/h) before moving ashore just west of the border of Mexico and Guatemala. It rapidly weakened over land, and on June 2 the National Hurricane Center discontinued advisories on the storm. Despite expectations that the storm would attain hurricane status, Barbara moved ashore as a small, weak tropical storm. It produced locally heavy rainfall and gusty winds, and in most locations damage was minor. However, in southern Mexico, the rainfall destroyed large areas of cropland, with crop damage totaling 200 million pesos (2007 MXN, $55 million 2007 USD). In El Salvador, four people were killed by storm-induced floods.

== Meteorological history ==
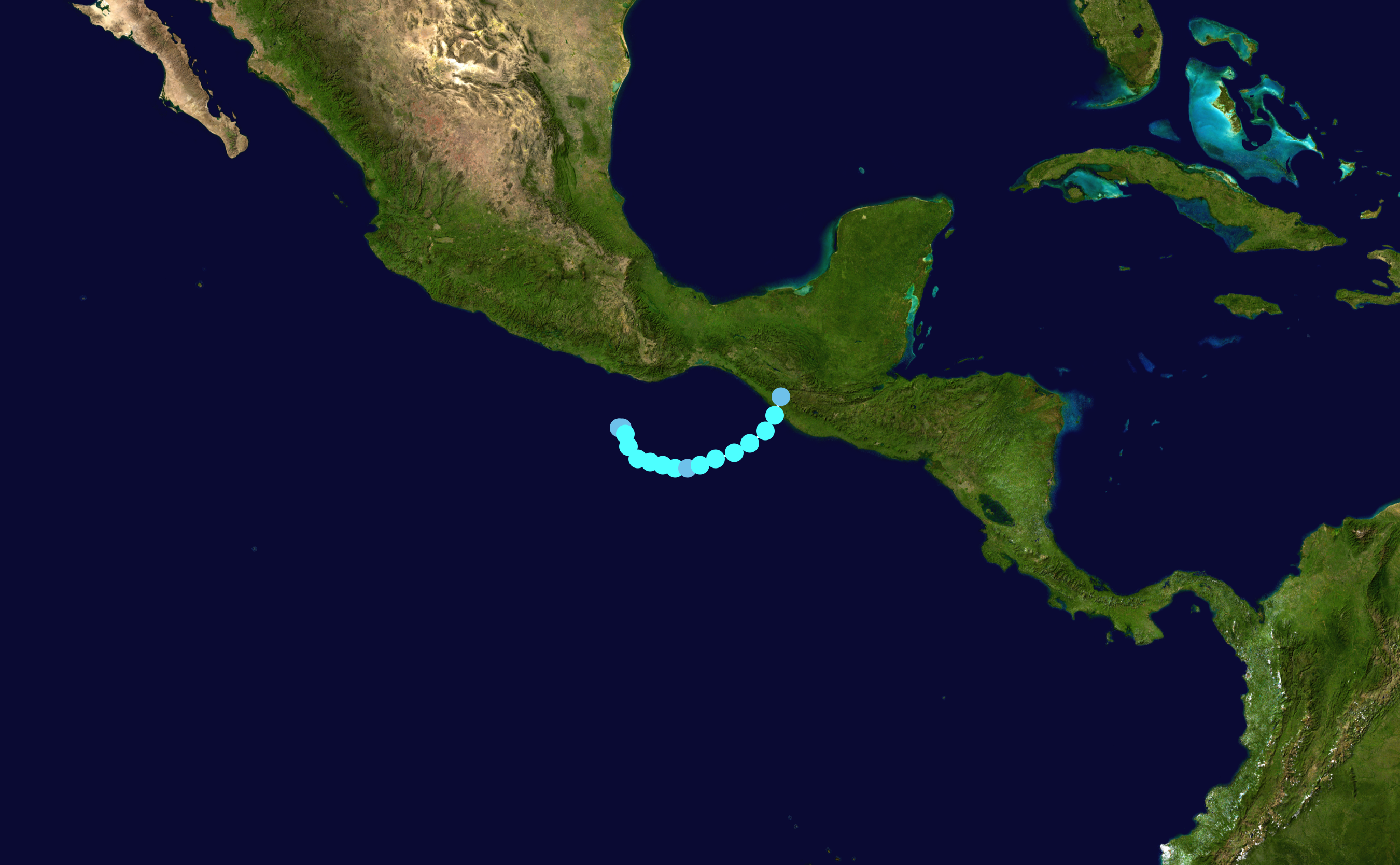
Map plotting the storm's track and intensity, according to the Saffir–Simpson scale Map key Saffir–Simpson scale Tropical depression (≤38 mph, ≤62 km/h) Tropical storm (39–73 mph, 63–118 km/h) Category 1 (74–95 mph, 119–153 km/h) Category 2 (96–110 mph, 154–177 km/h) Category 3 (111–129 mph, 178–208 km/h) Category 4 (130–156 mph, 209–251 km/h) Category 5 (≥157 mph, ≥252 km/h) Unknown Storm type Tropical cyclone Subtropical cyclone Extratropical cyclone, remnant low, tropical disturbance, or monsoon depression

A tropical wave moved off the coast of Africa on May 14, which is believed to have been the impetus to Barbara. The wave axis crossed Central America on May 25 and emerged into the eastern North Pacific Ocean the next day. Interacting with the Intertropical Convergence Zone, a broad surface low-pressure area developed within the area on May 27, and as it drifted northward the system maintained limited and disorganized convection. On May 29, convection increased and became concentrated near the low pressure center, and banding features developed in its eastern semicircle as the circulation became better defined. It is estimated the system formed into Tropical Depression Two-E at 1800 UTC on May 29 about 115 miles (185 km) southeast of Puerto Escondido, Oaxaca. Upon becoming a tropical cyclone, the depression was stationary in an area with warm sea surface temperatures, very light wind shear, and favorable upper-level conditions.

In the hours after becoming a tropical cyclone, the deep convection associated with the depression decreased, though it again increased later in the day. A ragged rainband developed in the southeastern quadrant of the circulation, and based on increased Dvorak numbers and improved presentation on satellite imagery, the National Hurricane Center upgraded the depression to Tropical Storm Barbara on May 30 while it was located about 115 miles (185 km) south of Puerto Escondido. This marked only the third time on record that two storms formed in May in the basin, after 1956 and 1984. Initially, Barbara was forecast to intensify to attain hurricane status and reach winds of 85 mph (135 km/h).

The storm drifted southward and later eastward due to northerly flow behind a mid- to upper-level trough in the Gulf of Mexico. With well-defined outflow and warm sea surface temperatures, Barbara became better organized as tightly curved bands of convection developed near the center. However, by May 31, increased wind shear and less inflow deteriorated the definition of the circulation, causing the storm to weaken. By later that day, the system contained a very small circulation within a large-scale trough, and early on June 1 it was downgraded to tropical depression status. Later in the day, convective banding features re-developed, and after a QuikSCAT overpass indicated a well-defined circulation in the system, Barbara was again upgraded to tropical storm status. The storm reached peak winds of 50 mph (80 km/h) and turned to the northeast as it tracked through a break in a ridge extending from the southwest Gulf of Mexico. Banding features continued to organize, and shortly before moving ashore a low-level eye feature developed. At about 1300 UTC on June 2, Barbara made landfall just west of the border between Mexico and Guatemala. The center quickly deteriorated to tropical depression status over the mountainous terrain of extreme southeastern Chiapas, and Barbara dissipated within twelve hours of moving ashore.

== Preparations and impact ==
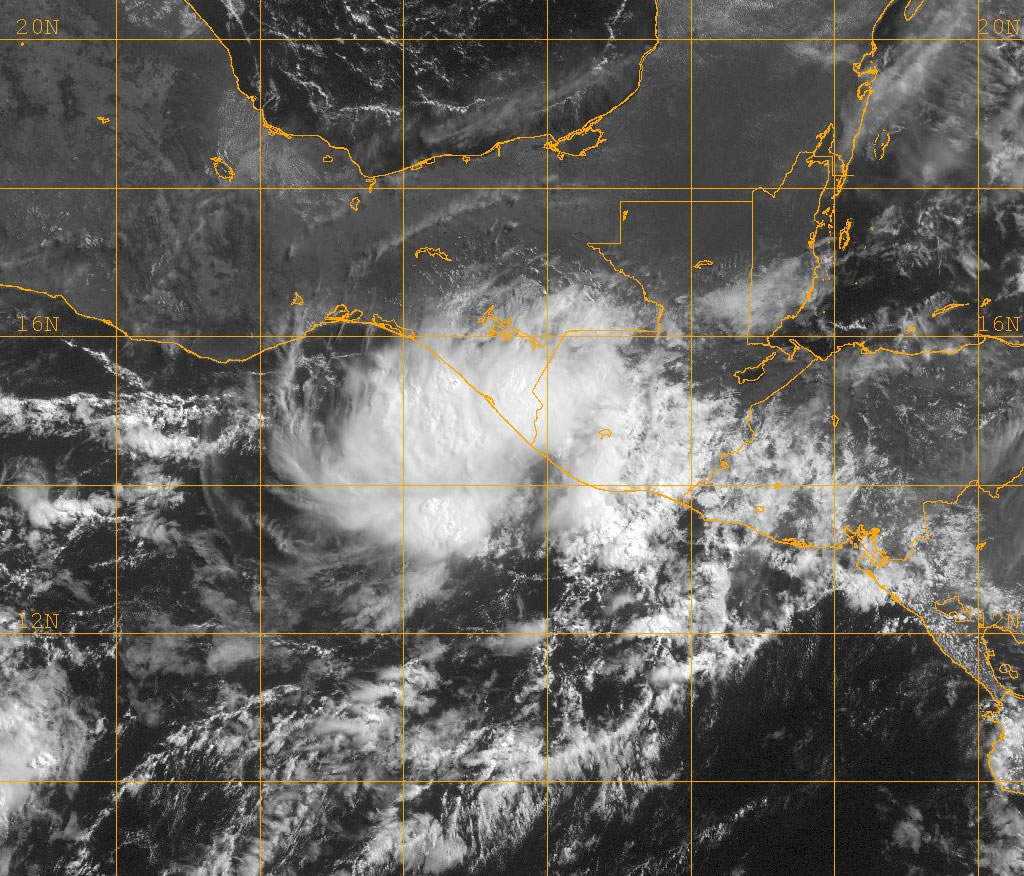
Tropical Storm Barbara near landfall

Early in the duration of the cyclone, the National Hurricane Center recommended for interests along the coast of southwestern Mexico to monitor the progress of the storm. Upon regaining tropical storm status on June 1, the governments of Guatemala and Mexico issued a tropical storm watch from Sipacate, Guatemala to Barra de Tonala, Mexico. Later, as the track became more apparent, the watch was replaced by a tropical storm warning, and a tropical storm watch was extended westward to Salina Cruz, Mexico. Officials in Mexico allocated emergency funds for southern regions of Chiapas and Oaxaca in preparation for a potential flooding disaster. At least 1,400 people were evacuated in Chiapas to emergency shelters.

The outer rainbands of the storm first began affecting Guatemala and southeastern Mexico late on June 1. In Mexico, the peak 24-hour rainfall total was 4.96 inches (126 mm) in Huixtla, and across southeastern Mexico, the rainfall led to above normal levels in many rivers. An automatic surface station in Puerto Madero, Mexico recorded sustained winds of 36 mph (58 km/h) with gusts of 53 mph (85 km/h) shortly after landfall. In most locations, damage from the storm was minor, limited to downed light posts, some damaged roofs, and a brief power outage. However, winds and rains from the storm caused moderate to severe crop damage in the mountain range of southern Chiapas. About 35 sq. miles (90 km^{2}) of banana crops were destroyed, with about 4 sq. miles (10 km^{2}) of coffee damaged. The passage of the storm also resulted in damage to cocoa beans, mango, coconut, and other vegetables, with crop damage totaling about 200 million pesos (2007 MXN, $55 million 2007 USD). As a result of the crop damage, the government of Mexico provided 108 million pesos (2007 MXN, $10 million 2007 USD) in financial aid to the affected farmers.

In Ocos, Guatemala near the border, winds from the storm destroyed the roofs of about a dozen palm huts, forcing over 100 residents to evacuate. The winds also downed hundreds of trees near the coastline. Heavy rainfall from the storm led to river flooding; the island of Ocos was separated from the mainland after the bridge was washed away. Heavy rains along the periphery of the storm triggered significant flooding in El Salvador which killed at least four people.

== See also ==
- Other tropical cyclones named Barbara
- Timeline of the 2007 Pacific hurricane season
- Hurricane Barbara (2013) – affected the same places
