= Tropical Storm Dalila (2007) =

Pacific tropical storm in 2007

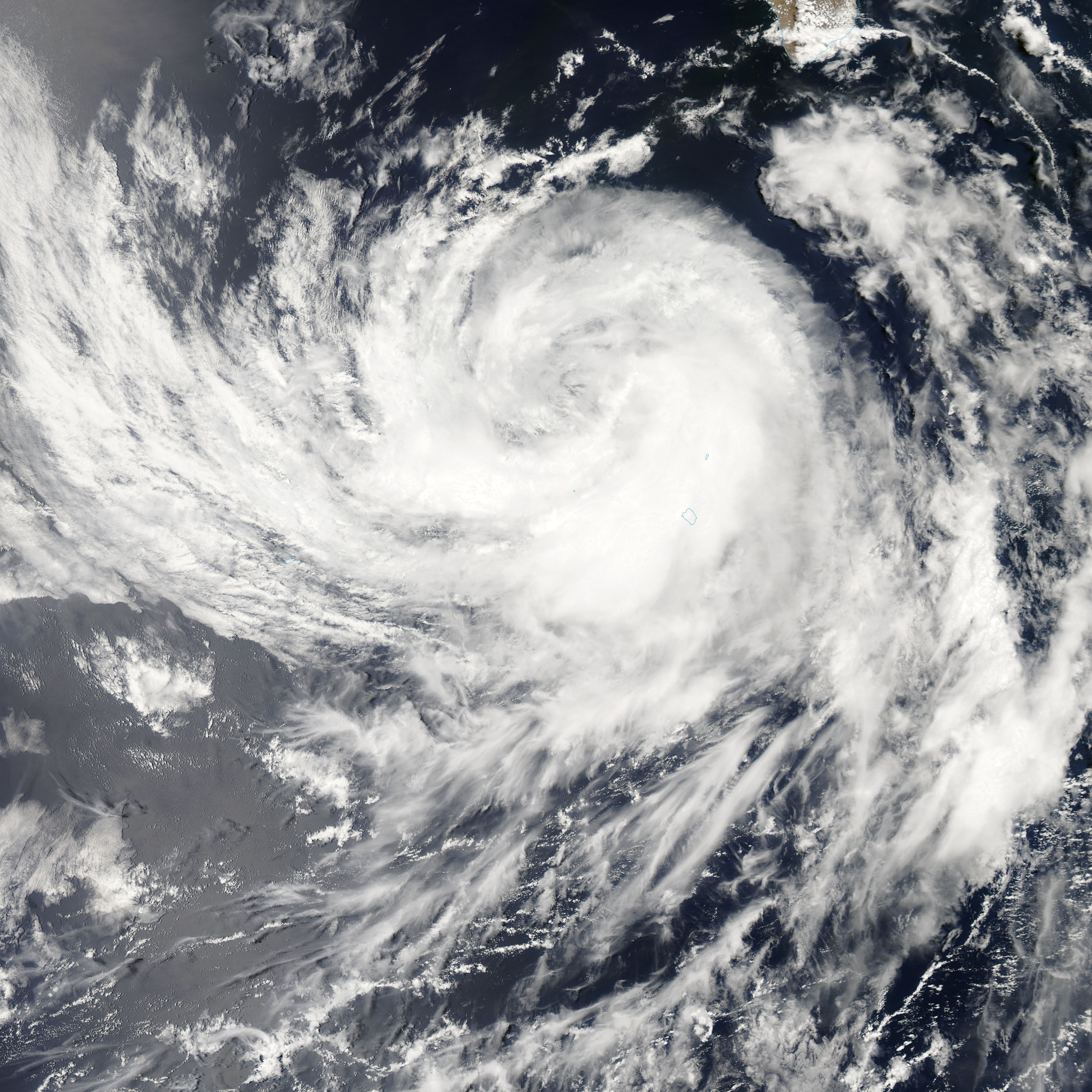
- Tropical Storm Dalila shortly after peak intensity on July 25

Meteorological history
- Formed: July 22, 2007
- Remnant low: July 27
- Dissipated: July 30, 2007

Tropical storm
- 1-minute sustained (SSHWS/NWS)
- Highest winds: 60 mph (95 km/h)
- Lowest pressure: 995 mbar (hPa); 29.38 inHg

Overall effects
- Fatalities: 11 direct
- Damage: Minimal
- Areas affected: Baja California Sur, Jalisco, and Socorro Island
- IBTrACS
- Part of the 2007 Pacific hurricane season

Tropical Storm Dalila caused flooding in western Mexico in late July 2007. The seventh tropical cyclone and the fourth named storm of the 2007 Pacific hurricane season, Dalila developed from a tropical wave located well southwest of Mexico on July 22. Initially, northeasterly shear caused the depression to remain disorganized, though by early on July 24, it was upgraded to Tropical Storm Dalila. During the next twenty-four hours, Dalila strengthened slightly further while tracking steadily northwestward, attaining peak winds of 60 mph (97 km/h) early on the following day. Shortly thereafter, Dalila either crossed or moved very close to Socorro Island on July 25. Due to decreasing sea surface temperatures, the storm slowly began to weaken, after curving west-northwestward. Early on July 27, Dalila was downgraded to a tropical depression, several hours before degenerating into a remnant low pressure area.

Despite its close passage to Socorro Island near peak intensity, no impact was reported. On the mainland of Mexico, the outer rainbands of Dalila dropped heavy rainfall, especially in Baja California Sur, Jalisco, with more than 16 inches (410 mm) of precipitation in some areas. The worst flooding occurred in Jalisco, where streets were inundated with more than 6 feet (1.8 m) of water, causing many car accidents. Additionally, 50 homes were destroyed, leaving approximately 200 people homeless. Eleven fatalities were confirmed, all of them occurred in Jalisco, most of which from drowning. Portions of Baja California Sur also experienced heavy rains from Dalila and its remnants, though no flooding was reported.

== Meteorological history ==
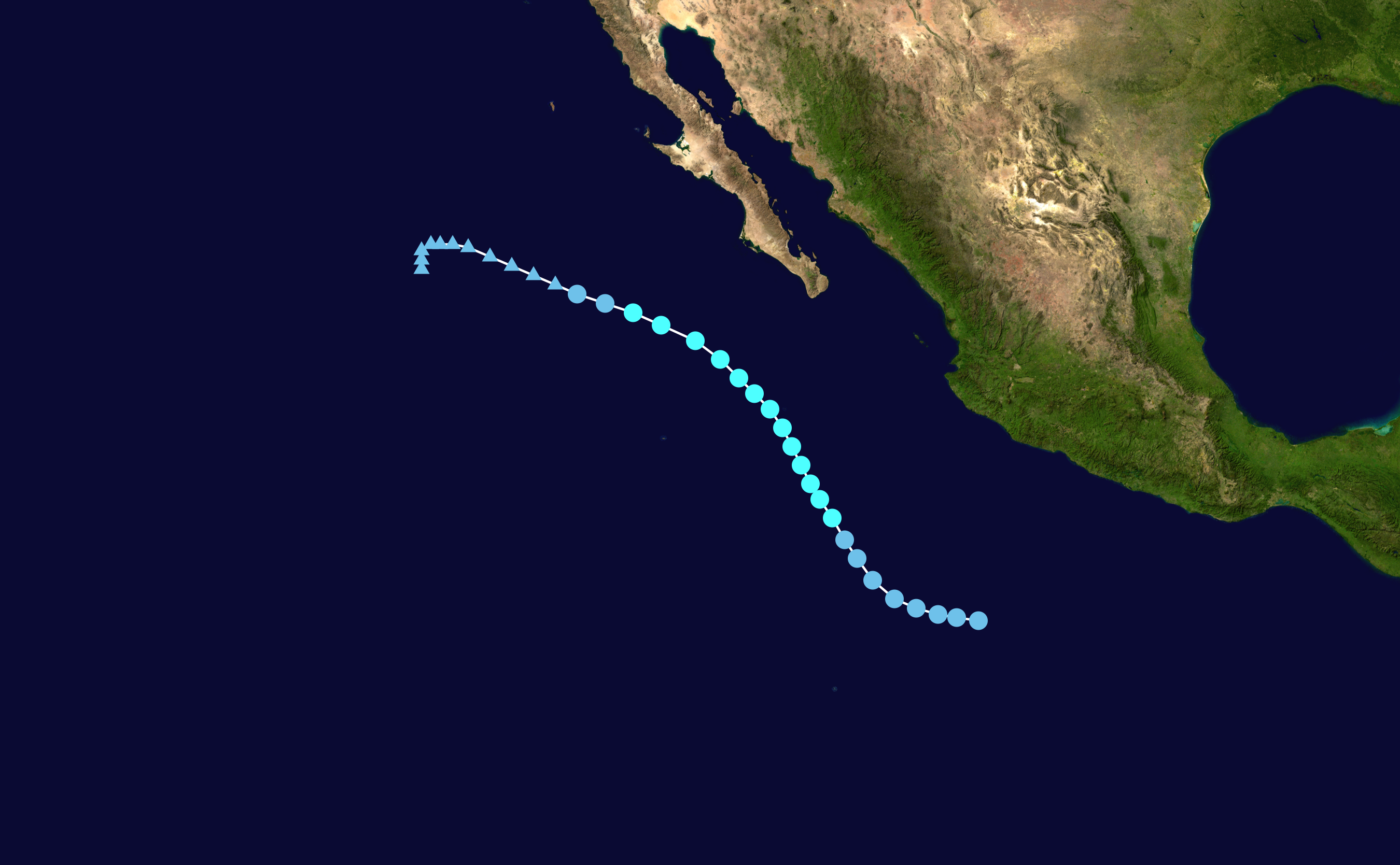
Map plotting the storm's track and intensity, according to the Saffir–Simpson scale Map key Saffir–Simpson scale Tropical depression (≤38 mph, ≤62 km/h) Tropical storm (39–73 mph, 63–118 km/h) Category 1 (74–95 mph, 119–153 km/h) Category 2 (96–110 mph, 154–177 km/h) Category 3 (111–129 mph, 178–208 km/h) Category 4 (130–156 mph, 209–251 km/h) Category 5 (≥157 mph, ≥252 km/h) Unknown Storm type Tropical cyclone Subtropical cyclone Extratropical cyclone, remnant low, tropical disturbance, or monsoon depression

A tropical wave entered the eastern Pacific Ocean on July 17. Two days later, the wave spawned a low pressure area while located several hundred miles south-southeast of the Gulf of Tehuantepec. The National Hurricane Center began issuing Tropical Weather Outlooks (TWOs) (Note: A Tropical Weather Outlook (TWO) is a discussion issued every six hours of significant areas of disturbed weather and their potential for development out to 48 hours.) and initially noting that slow development was possible within the next 48 hours. Convective activity increased and Dvorak satellite classifications began early on July 21. Another TWO issued later that day indicated that the circulation was becoming better-defined. After additional development, it is estimated that Tropical Depression Seven-E formed at 0000 UTC on July 22, while about 460 miles (740 km) south of Manzanillo, Colima. A strong upper-level high pressure area generated moderate shear, though the National Hurricane Center noted that it would not interfere with intensification. However, the depression initially failed to strengthen significantly. It remained disorganized, with the circulation elongated northeastward to southwestward and deep convection displaced to the west. Early on July 23, a burst of deep convection occurred southwest of the center of circulation, while satellite imagery indicated that development of banding features.

Until late on July 23, it was predicted that the depression would strengthen significantly and peak with winds of 70 mph (110 km/h), just slightly under hurricane intensity. Finally, the depression strengthened into Tropical Storm Dalila by 0000 UTC on July 24. Due to an anticipated decrease in wind shear, Dalila was again predicted to peak with winds of 70 mph (110 km/h) early on July 26. However, at 0000 UTC on July 25, Dalila attained its peak intensity with maximum sustained winds of 60 mph (97 km/h) and a minimum barometric pressure of 995 mbar (29.4 inHg). Shortly thereafter, it passed over or very close to Socorro Island. Later on July 25, Dalila curved west-northwestward and began entering a region of colder sea surface temperatures, resulting in weakening as the cloud pattern became less organized. Due to the quick deterioration of the storm, the National Hurricane Center noted that, "Dalila is winding down faster than anticipated". Early on July 27, it weakened to a tropical depression. Later that day, the storm became devoid of deep convection for over 12 hours. As a result, the National Hurricane Center ceased advisories on Dalila late on July 27, since it degenerated into a remnant low pressure area while located about 460 miles (740 km) west of the southern tip of Baja California. The remnant low moved west-northwestward during the next few days and then curved west-southwestward on July 29. It drifted southward on July 30 and dissipated about 700 miles (1,100 km) west of the southern tip of Baja California later that day.

== Impact and aftermath ==
Because the storm remained well away from the mainland of Mexico, no tropical cyclone warnings and watches were issued. However, the Civil Defense authorities in Mexico posted a "blue alert" for the states of Baja California Sur, Colima, Jalisco, Michoacán, and Nayarit on July 23. Simultaneously, a "green alert" was issued for Colima, Jalisco, and Michoacán. Rainfall in excess of 16 in (410 mm) fell in parts of western Mexico on July 22. The heavy rains triggered flooding in Jalisco that killed 11 people. Three people drowned in a van after driving into a flooded road, while a fourth fatality occurred after another car was swept away into a river. The fifth fatality also resulted from drowning near a hydroelectric plant. Four people were killed after a train derailed on a flooded track. Five other people were injured by the crash, two of which were critically injured. Flood waters up to 6.6 ft (2.0 m) covered numerous roads, stranding 45 vehicles and resulting in 75 accidents, which caused at least 25 injuries. About 50 homes were destroyed by the storm in Jalisco, leaving approximately 200 people homeless.

There was also significant flooding in Michoacán, where up to 15.75 inches (400 mm) of precipitation fell in the city of Zamora. City officials reported that 10 neighborhoods were flooded. In rural areas of Michoacán, a combination of heavy rains and hail destroyed about 40 homes. Offshore the city of Acapulco in Guerrero, several waterspouts were spawned. As the storm weakened, it produced rough seas and heavy rains over parts of Baja California Sur. Although Dalila passed over Socorro Island with winds of 60 mph (97 km/h), there were no reports of any deaths or damage. Following the storm, the Government of Mexico supplied the affected residents with special care, blankets, and cardboard sheets.

== See also ==
- Other tropical cyclones of the same name
- Timeline of the 2007 Pacific hurricane season
