= Hurricane Carlotta (2012) =

Category 2 Pacific hurricane in 2012

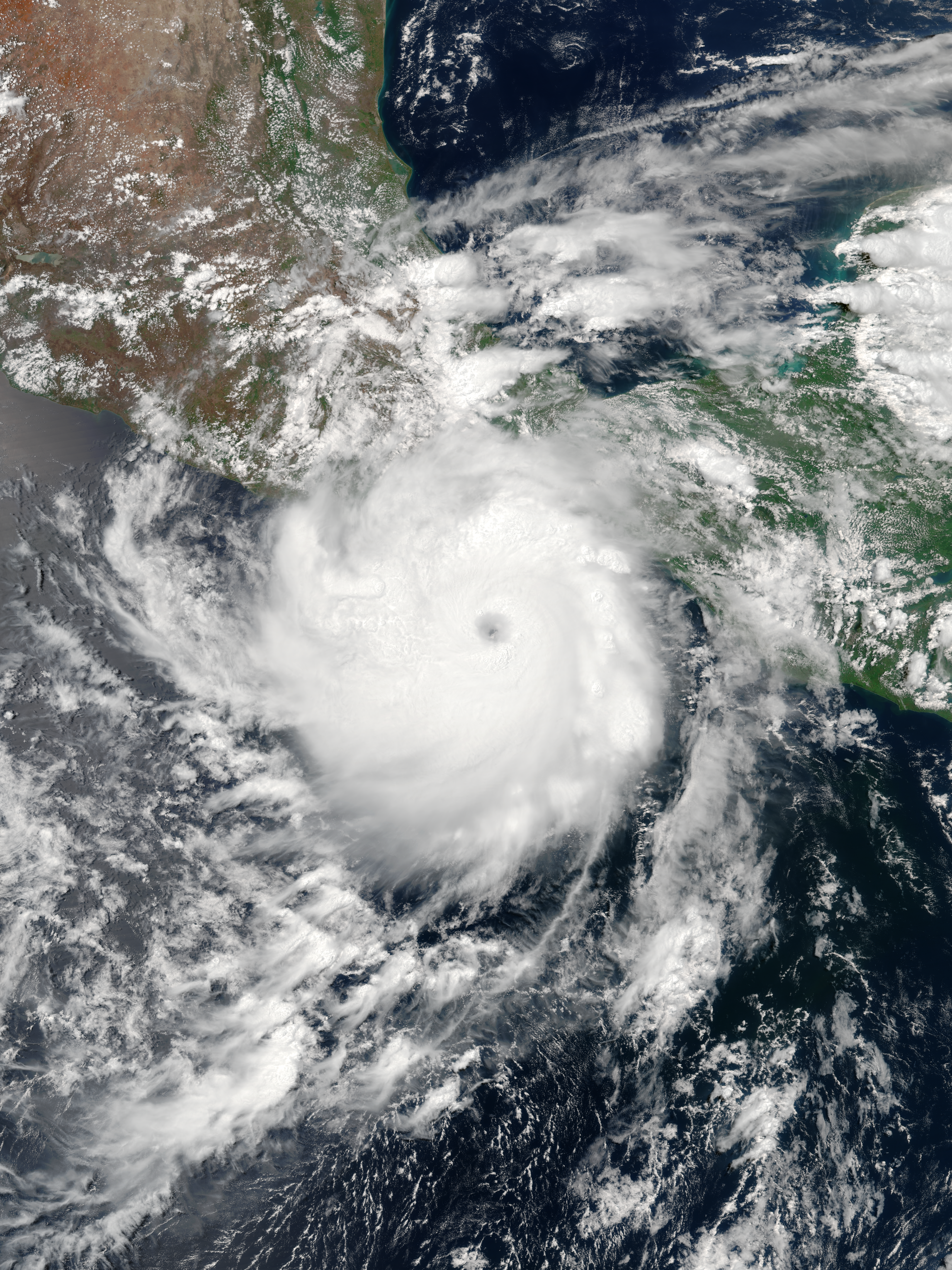
- Carlotta at peak intensity, nearing landfall in Mexico on June 15.

Meteorological history
- Formed: June 14, 2012
- Remnant low: June 16, 2012
- Dissipated: June 17, 2012

Category 2 hurricane
- 1-minute sustained (SSHWS/NWS)
- Highest winds: 110 mph (175 km/h)
- Lowest pressure: 973 mbar (hPa); 28.73 inHg

Overall effects
- Fatalities: 7
- Damage: $12.4 million (2012 USD)
- Areas affected: Southwestern Mexico
- IBTrACS /
- Part of the 2012 Pacific hurricane season

Hurricane Carlotta was the easternmost tropical cyclone in the Eastern Pacific to make landfall at hurricane intensity since 1966. The third tropical cyclone and third named storm of the 2012 Pacific hurricane season, Carlotta developed slowly into a tropical depression from a tropical wave southwest of Central America on June 14. It moved generally west-northwestward and by the following day, strengthened into tropical storm strength. Thereafter, gradual intensification occurred and the storm reached hurricane strength on June 15. Rapid intensification ensued further, as Carlotta peaked as a 110 mph (180 km/h) Category 2 hurricane on the same day. At 0100 UTC the following day, Carlotta made landfall near Puerto Escondido, the easternmost landfalling Pacific hurricane in recorded history at the time. The next day the storm began to weaken as it moved onshore Southwestern Mexico. Carlotta continued to weaken rapidly, eventually dissipating on June 16.

Throughout Mexico, widespread power outages and wind damage was reported, particularly in Oaxaca. Infrastructural damage was also reported due to winds and rain, as well as damage to crops. Rainfall from Carlotta peaked at 13.78 in (35.0 cm) in San Juan Bautista Tuxtepec. Numerous mudslides resulted from the heavy rains, which blocked roads and damaged structures. At least 29,000 homes and 2,500 businesses sustained damage from Carlotta, mostly in Oaxaca. Seven people were killed by Carlotta, and the state of Oaxaca requested MX$1.44 billion (US$113 million) for repairs to public infrastructure. (Note: Conversions from Mexican Pesos to United States Dollars were done using this site, with an exchange date of June 16, 2012.)

== Meteorological history ==
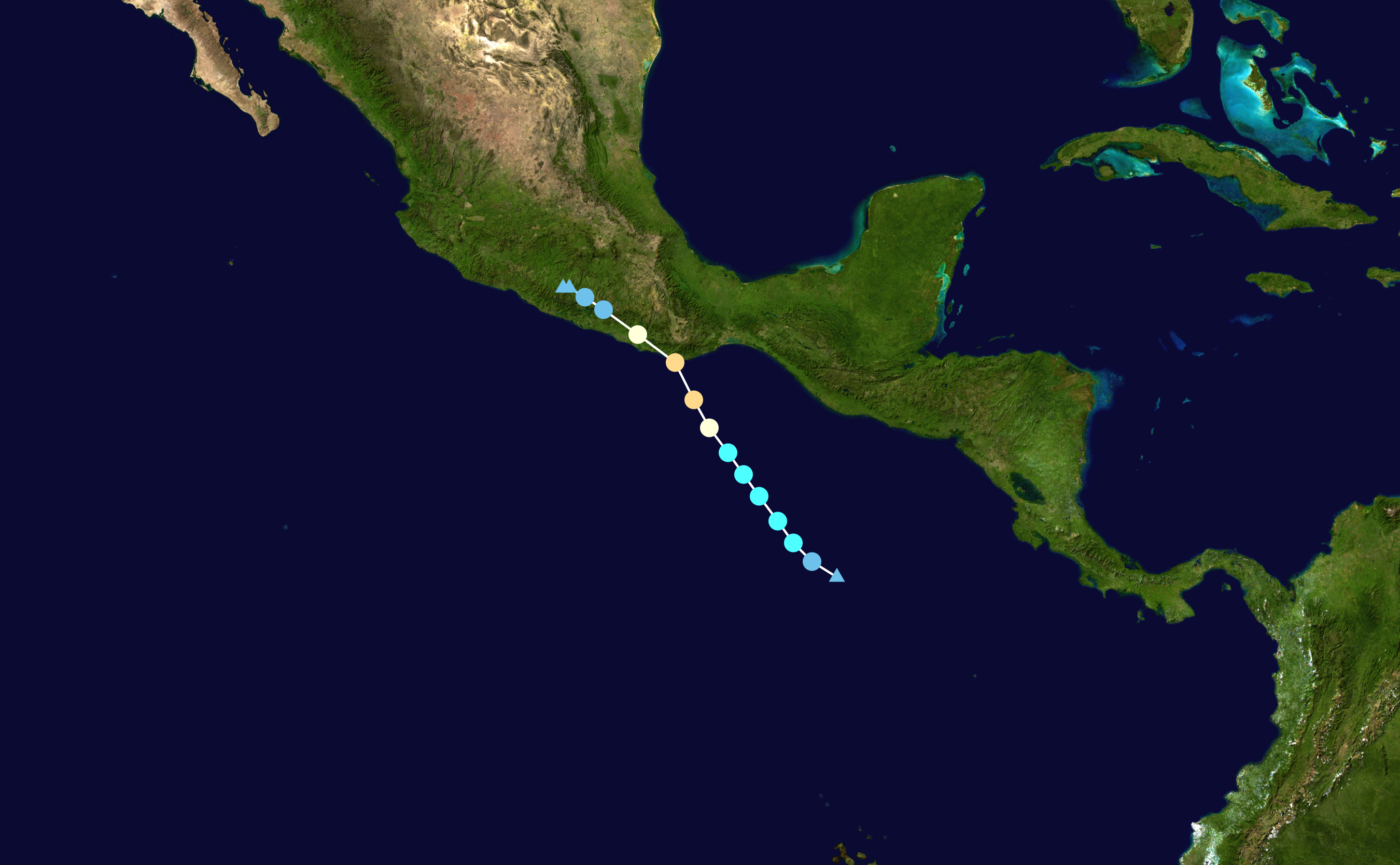
Map plotting the storm's track and intensity, according to the Saffir–Simpson scale Map key Saffir–Simpson scale Tropical depression (≤38 mph, ≤62 km/h) Tropical storm (39–73 mph, 63–118 km/h) Category 1 (74–95 mph, 119–153 km/h) Category 2 (96–110 mph, 154–177 km/h) Category 3 (111–129 mph, 178–208 km/h) Category 4 (130–156 mph, 209–251 km/h) Category 5 (≥157 mph, ≥252 km/h) Unknown Storm type Tropical cyclone Subtropical cyclone Extratropical cyclone, remnant low, tropical disturbance, or monsoon depression

On June 12, a tropical disturbance developed off the west coast of Costa Rica, moved westward and entered the eastern Pacific after crossing Panama. The system became better organized as it tracked to the west-northwest as a westerly Kelvin wave provided favorable conditions for development. Convection increased around a developing low pressure area, and the National Hurricane Center (NHC) estimated a 50% chance of tropical cyclogenesis by late on June 12. After further organization, the NHC initiated advisories on Tropical Depression Three-E at 0300 UTC on June 14, while the system was located about 515 mi (829 km) south-southeast of Puerto Ángel, Oaxaca. At the time, the depression was located in an area of low wind shear and warm sea surface temperature conditions that were considered favorable for intensification. In addition, it had a small circulation, which increased the possibility for rapid deepening. The system moved northwestward after forming due to an extended ridge to the northeast. About six hours after forming, the depression intensified into Tropical Storm Carlotta, after rainbands increased around the center.

With continued favorable conditions, Carlotta quickly developed a ragged central dense overcast, or centralized area of convection. An eye feature began developing on June 15, and later that day Carlotta intensified into a hurricane while approaching southwestern Mexico. A Hurricane Hunters flight late on June 15 indicated Carlotta was rapidly intensifying, observing winds of 110 mph (180 km/h) in the eye and well-established outflow; the crew also observed flight-level winds of 114 mph (183 km/h). The NHC initially predicted the hurricane would move along the Mexican coast just offshore, which would have allowed Carlotta to maintain much of its intensity. Shortly after its peak, Hurricane Carlotta weakened slightly as to the eye's began to interact with land. The hurricane made landfall near Puerto Escondido, Oaxaca, with winds estimated at 105 mph (169 km/h) and a minimum pressure of 976 mbar (28.8 inHg), shortly after 0100 UTC on June 16, becoming the easternmost tropical cyclone in the Eastern Pacific to make landfall at hurricane intensity on record until surpassed by Hurricane Barbara a year later. Carlotta rapidly weakened while moving inland, and it had deteriorated to tropical depression status by 12 hours after landfall. Although the cloud pattern became disrupted, the storm maintained a large area of thunderstorms. Very early on June 17, the NHC reported that Carlotta had weakened into a post-tropical remnant low; the system still had a broad circulation over southwestern Mexico at the time. Later that day, the low degenerated into a trough along the west coast of Mexico.

== Preparations and impact ==
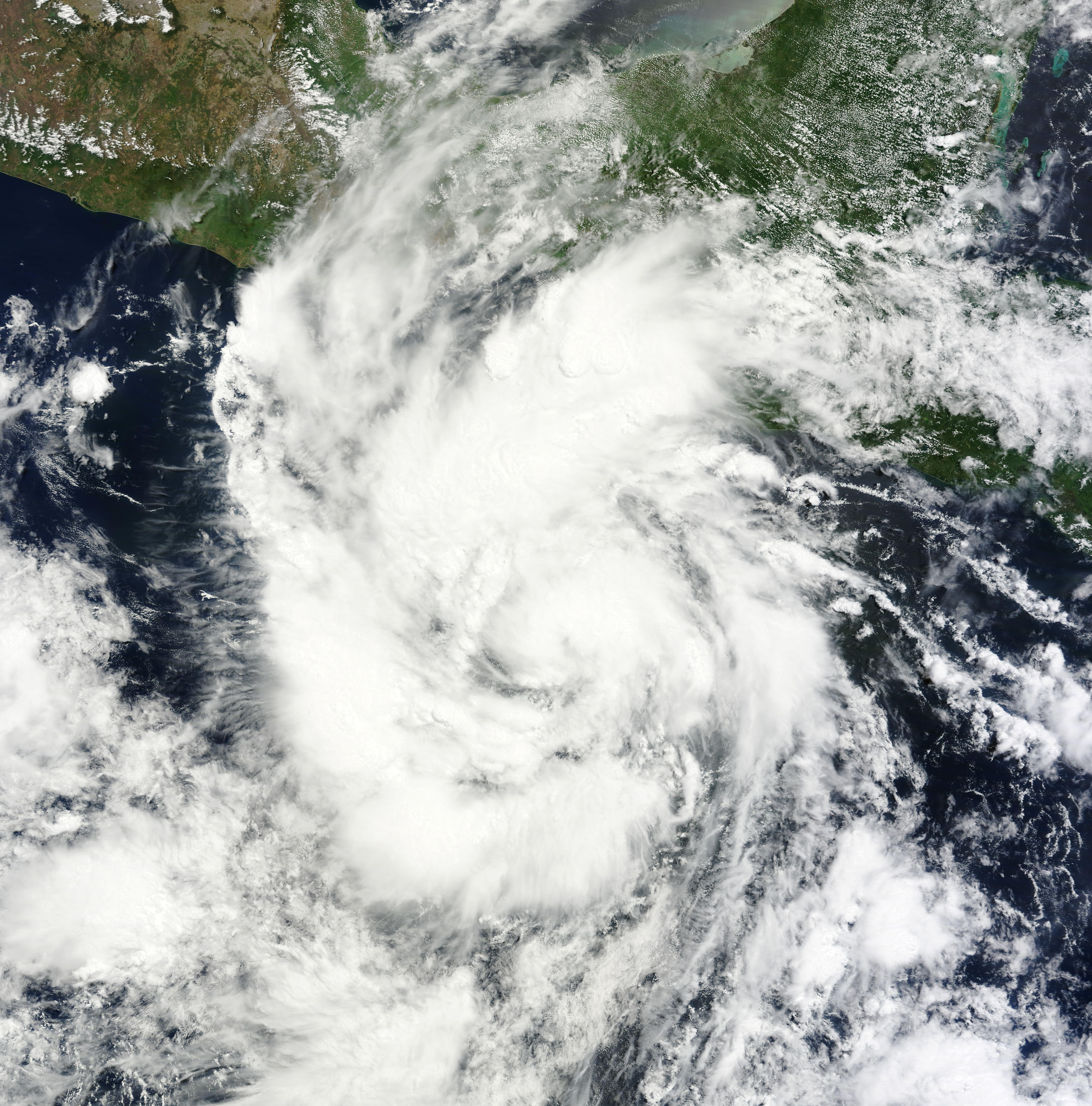
Tropical Storm Carlotta intensifying on June 14

When the system was first classified as a tropical cyclone on June 14, the government of Mexico issued hurricane watch and a tropical storm watch for a portion of the Mexican Coast from Barra de Tonala to Punta Maldonado. Later that day, the watch was upgraded into a hurricane warning. Meanwhile, authorities issued an orange alert for most of Oaxaca, the second highest alert, and a yellow alert, the third highest alert, for northern Oaxaca, Chiapas and Guerrero. A green alert was issued for the state of Puebla, and blue alert, the second lowest alert, for southern Veracruz, Tabasco, Tlaxcala, Morelos and Michoacán. In Oaxaca, officials arranged evacuations for residents in low-lying areas to go to schools, halls, and churches. In the fishing port of Puerto Angel, boating access was restricted. and the port of Salina Cruz was closed. To avoid family separations, schools were closed for several states. The government electricity agency channeled 608 electrical workers due to the threat of damage in the states of Oaxaca and Guerrero. A total of 23 plants were moved to provide emergency power supply.

Seven people were killed by the storm. A 56-year-old woman was killed in a traffic accident that is blamed by the storm's gusty winds that flipped over her car. In Pluma Hidalgo, Carlotta destroyed a clay house that killed a 13-year-old girl and her 7-year-old sister. The hurricane ripped off roofs of houses and caused widespread power outages and small landslides. About 1,200 people moved to shelters throughout the city. According to authorities in Oaxaca, some roads were affected by mudslides; subsequently, they had opened emergency shelters and evacuated many of families from low-lying areas. In Puerto Escondido, near where the storm made landfall, billboards were toppled and windows were shattered. Towns throughout Oaxaca reported damage to roads, bridges, telephone lines, and crops. Rainfall from Carlotta peaked at 13.78 in (35.0 cm) in San Juan Bautista Tuxtepec. In wake of the storm, the governor of Oaxaca requested the Mexican government to declare his state a disaster area, and requested MX$1.44 billion (US$113 million) for repairs to public infrastructure. At least 29,000 homes and 2,500 businesses sustained damage from Carlotta, mostly in Oaxaca. Total insured losses caused by Carlotta were estimated to be about US$12.4 million.

== See also ==
- Timeline of the 2012 Pacific hurricane season
- Hurricane Andres (1979)
- Tropical Storm Beatriz (1993)
- Hurricane Alma (1996)
- Hurricane Boris (1996)
- Hurricane Barbara (2013)
- Tropical Storm Boris (2014)
- Hurricane Agatha (2022)
- Hurricane Erick (2025)
- Other storms named Carlotta
