= Hurricane Barbara (2013) =

Pacific hurricane in 2013

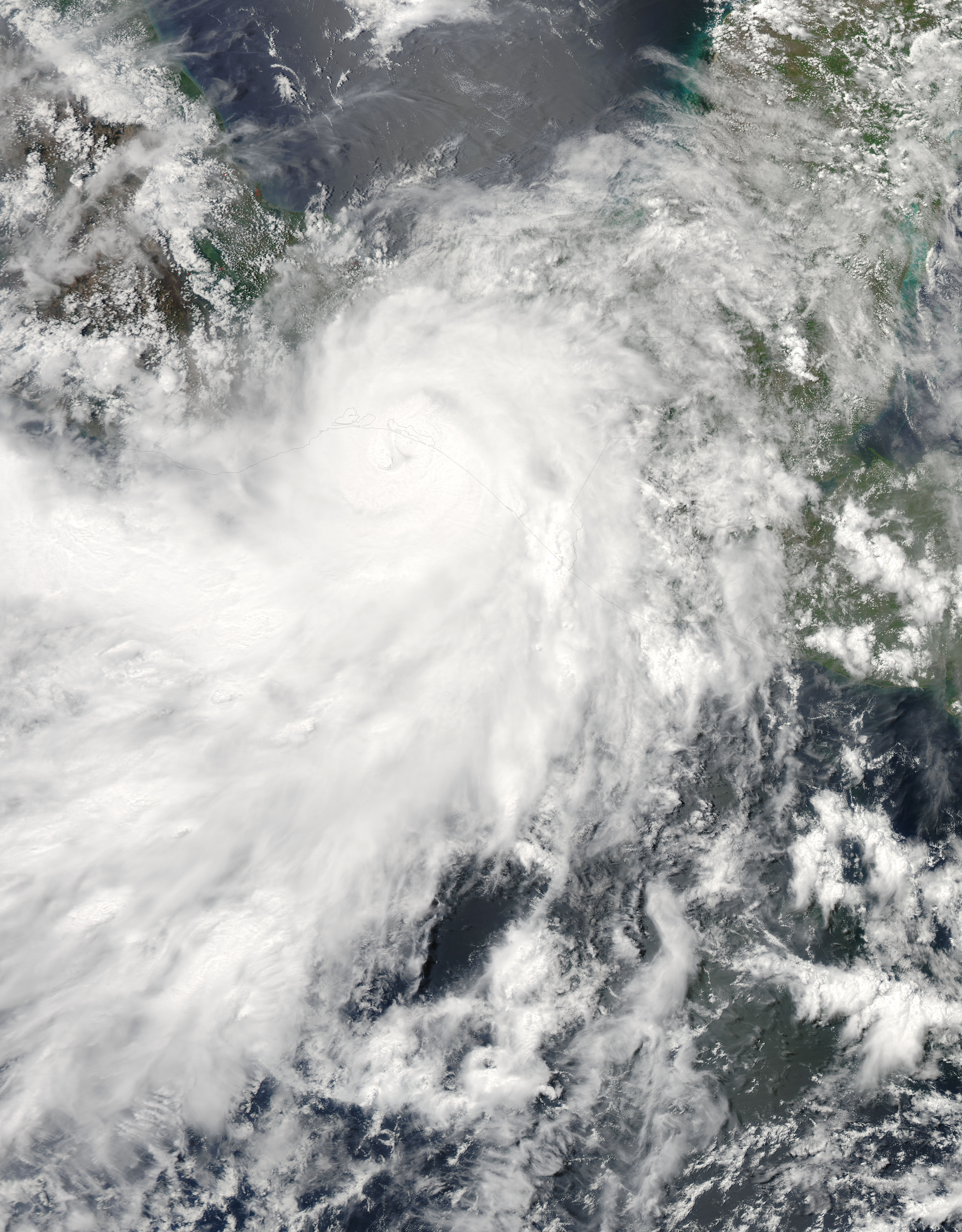
- Barbara at peak intensity on May 29

Meteorological history
- Formed: May 28, 2013
- Remnant low: May 30, 2013
- Dissipated: May 31, 2013

Category 1 hurricane
- 1-minute sustained (SSHWS/NWS)
- Highest winds: 80 mph (130 km/h)
- Lowest pressure: 983 mbar (hPa); 29.03 inHg

Overall effects
- Fatalities: 5
- Damage: $148 million (2013 USD)
- Areas affected: El Salvador, Guatemala, Southwestern Mexico, Eastern Mexico
- IBTrACS
- Part of the 2013 Pacific hurricane season

Hurricane Barbara was the easternmost landfalling Pacific hurricane on record. As the first hurricane of the 2013 Pacific hurricane season, Barbara developed from a low-pressure area while located southeast of Mexico on May 28. (Note: All dates are based on Coordinated Universal Time (UTC).) It headed slowly north-northeastward and strengthened into a tropical storm early on the following day. After recurving to the northeast, Barbara intensified into a Category 1 hurricane on May 29 and made landfall in Chiapas at peak intensity with winds of 80 mph (130 km/h) and a barometric pressure estimated at 983 mbar (hPa; 29.03 inHg). When the hurricane made landfall, it was the second earliest landfalling hurricane in the basin since reliable records began in 1966. Barbara then moved across the Isthmus of Tehuantepec and dissipated within the mountainous terrain of Sierra Madre de Chiapas on May 30.

The precursor of Hurricane Barbara brought light to moderate rainfall to El Salvador. Many homes were damaged, roads were flooded, and several trees were downed. One fatality was reported in the country. Landslides caused by rainfall in Guatemala forced 30 people to flee their homes. In Mexico, tropical cyclone warnings and watches were issued in anticipitation of the storm. Many shelters opened in Chiapas, Oaxaca and Guatemala while schools and ports were temporarily closed during the storm. Torrential rains and power outages were reported in the area. In the state of Chiapas alone, 2,000 houses were damaged. About 57,000 people were left homeless. Significant impact to agriculture was also reported, with 10,000 ha (25,000 acres) of crops destroyed. Overall, Barbara caused 5 fatalities and 1.89 billion pesos (US$148 million) in damage. (Note: All currencies are in their 2013 values and are converted to United States dollars using data from the International Monetary Fund published by the World Bank.)

== Meteorological history ==
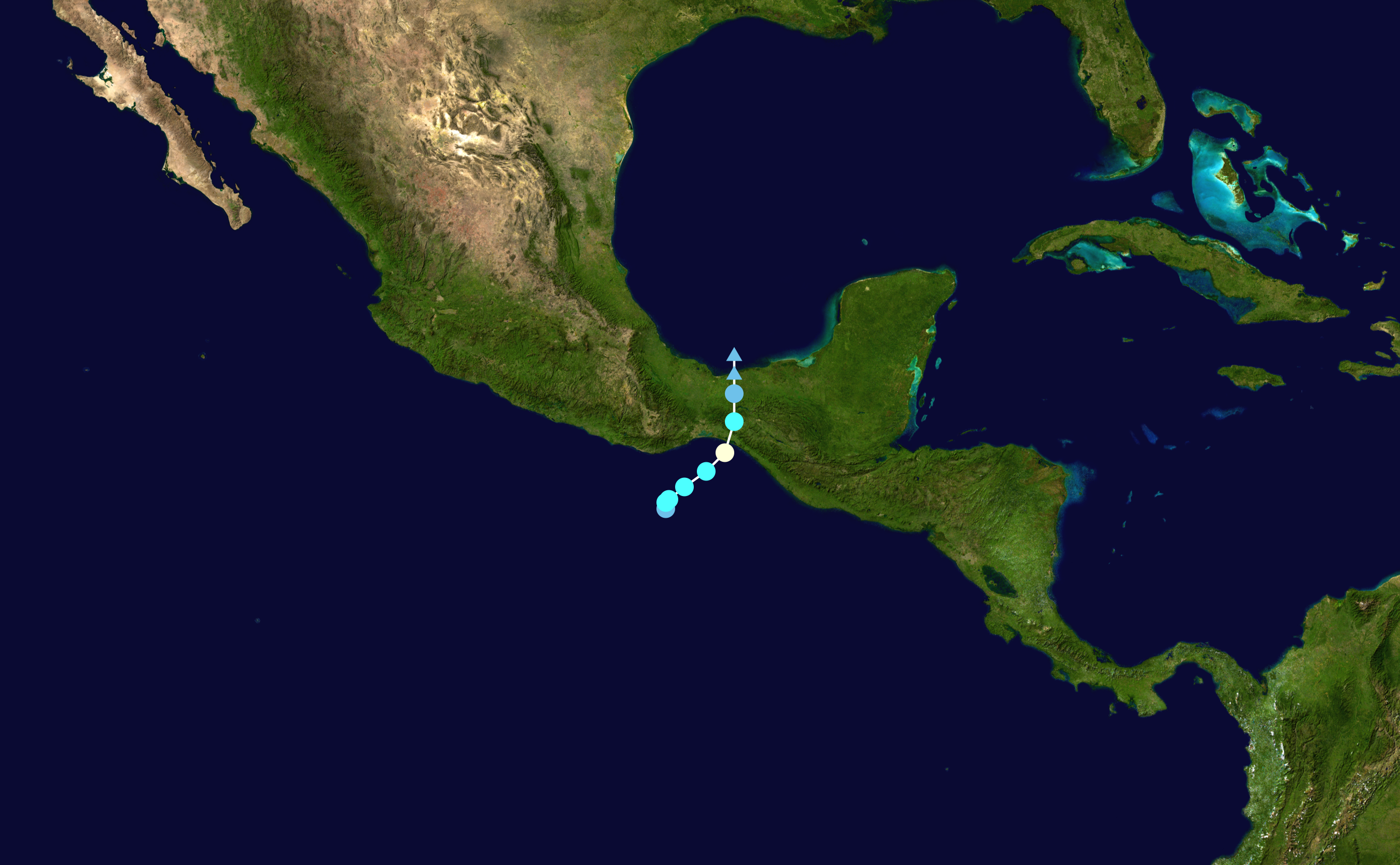
Map plotting the storm's track and intensity, according to the Saffir–Simpson scale Map key Saffir–Simpson scale Tropical depression (≤38 mph, ≤62 km/h) Tropical storm (39–73 mph, 63–118 km/h) Category 1 (74–95 mph, 119–153 km/h) Category 2 (96–110 mph, 154–177 km/h) Category 3 (111–129 mph, 178–208 km/h) Category 4 (130–156 mph, 209–251 km/h) Category 5 (≥157 mph, ≥252 km/h) Unknown Storm type Tropical cyclone Subtropical cyclone Extratropical cyclone, remnant low, tropical disturbance, or monsoon depression

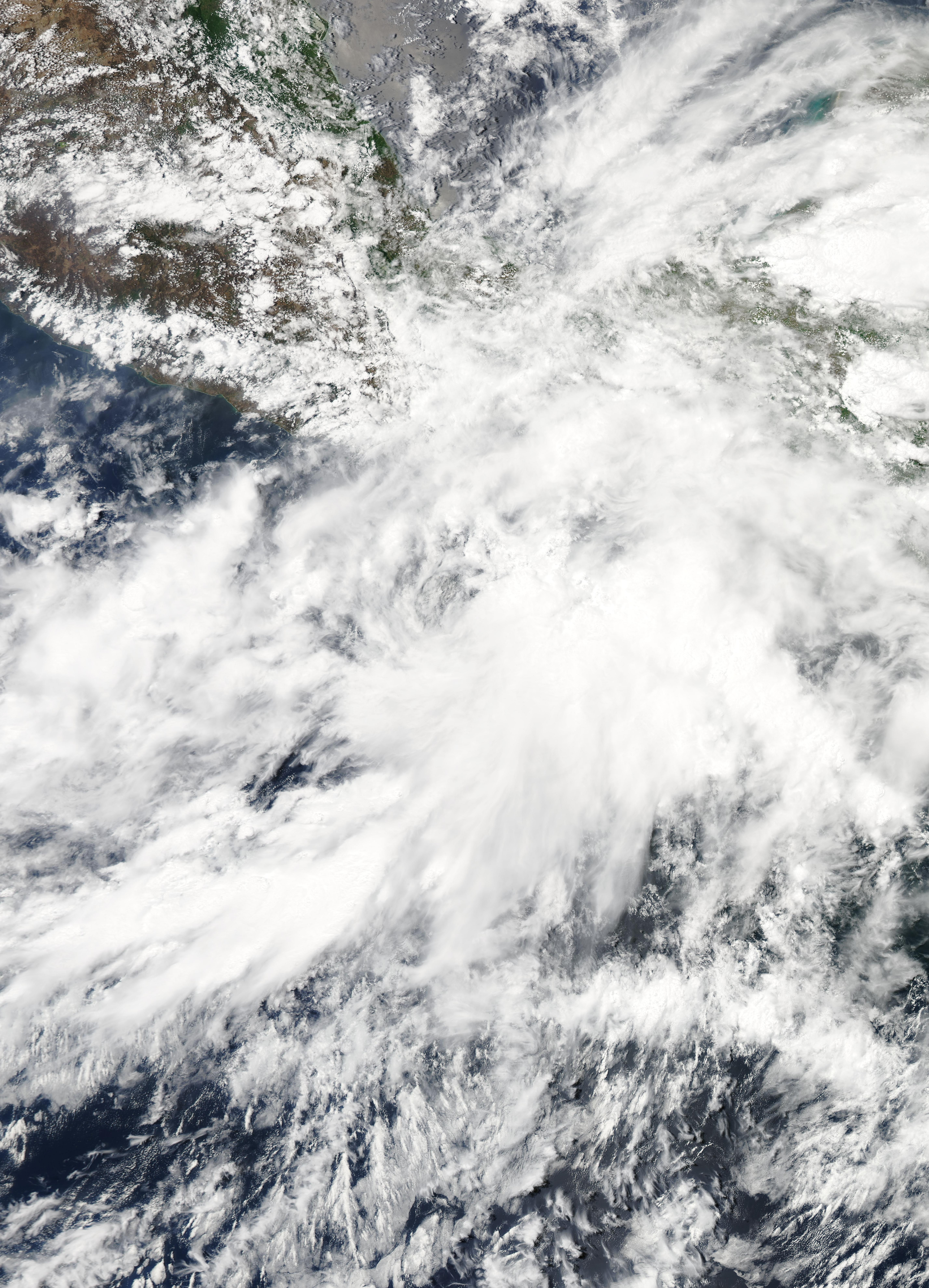
The monsoon trough precursor to Barbara on May 27

A tropical wave moved off the west coast of Africa on May 16 and crossed Central America into the Pacific Ocean on May 24. That day, the National Hurricane Center (NHC) began monitoring an area of disturbed weather about 150 mi (240 km) southwest of the Costa Rican coastline. At that time, this system was associated with a monsoon trough embedded within the Intertropical Convergence Zone. Despite being disorganized, gradual development of this system was anticipated by the NHC. On May 25, a broad low pressure area formed southwest of Nicaragua, after the tropical wave interacted with an eastward-moving Kelvin wave. Convection soon became organized around the newly formed low, and the NHC noted that the formation of a tropical cyclone within the subsequent 48 hours was likely. The NHC estimated that Tropical Depression Two-E developed at 1200 UTC on May 28 about 125 mi (205 km) south-southeast of Puerto Ángel, Oaxaca.

With warm water temperatures of over 86 °F (30 °C) and low wind shear, the newly formed tropical depression was able to quickly intensify. It developed a well-defined center with concentrated deep convection. Continued organization prompted the NHC to upgrade the depression to Tropical Storm Barbara at 0000 UTC on May 29. Post-analysis indicated that Barbara intensified into a tropical storm six hours earlier than originally assessed. Barbara began exhibiting an eye-like feature, and intensity estimates using the Dvorak Technique reached 40 mph (65 km/h). At this time, Barbara had begun to recurve to the northeast, within a gap of the subtropical ridge. By midnight, the eye-like feature developed into a central dense overcast (CDO), embedded within the deep convection. The rainbands of Barbara wrapped around much of the circulation, and radar imagery indicated the eyewall was consistently becoming better defined. Thereafter, the storm entered a phase of intensification as it began to accelerate towards the Chiapan coastline.

Barbara strengthened into a hurricane around 1800 UTC on May 29 while located about 65 mi (105 km) east-southeast of Salina Cruz, Mexico. At its peak intensity as it was making landfall, it had maximum sustained winds of 80 mph (130 km/h) and a barometric pressure estimated at 983 mbar (hPa; 29.03 inHg). With this intensity, Barbara made landfall on the coast of Tonalá, Chiapas at approximately 1950 UTC. This marked both the easternmost and second earliest landfalling hurricane in the basin since reliable records began in 1966. As Barbara moved inland within the Isthmus of Tehuantepec, rapid dissipation occurred. The cloud tops warmed and Barbara degenerated into a tropical storm at 0000 UTC on May 30. This was followed by a downgrade to tropical depression nine hours later as Barbara's low-level circulation was disrupted by the mountainous terrain. Very early on May 31, the non-convective remnant low of Barbara dissipated about 25 mi (40 km) north-northwest of Coatzacoalcos, Mexico, after emerging into the Gulf of Mexico.

== Preparations ==
Immediately after developing into a tropical cyclone on May 28, a tropical storm warning was issued by the Servicio Meteorológico Nacional along the coast of southern Mexico spanning from Lagunas de Chacahua National Park in Oaxaca to Boca de Pijijiapan, Chiapas. When the storm threatened to become a hurricane, a hurricane warning was declared for this region at 1025 UTC on May 29. In Campeche, a blue (minimal) alert was issued. In Guatemala, a "preventive" alert was issued; Barbara was similar to Hurricane Mitch and Tropical Storm Agatha (both which devastated the nation) and thus had the potential to produce flash floods. A yellow alert (moderate risk) was declared for central and southern Oaxaca and western Chiapas. For the southeastern and eastern part of Oaxaca and southwestern and central-western Chiapas, a red (high risk) alert was issued.

Many shelters were opened adjacent to rivers. In Chiapas, 122 shelters opened, having a grand capacity of 300,000 people though only 147 people used these shelters. In these shelters, officials set up 57 health centers. In Oaxaca, shelters were set up in 20 towns and hamlets. In all, coastal residents and marine interests were advised to take extreme caution in the states of Chiapas, Oaxaca, and Guerrero. In addition, classes were suspended in Oaxaca. Both large and small boats were anchored in Playa Manzanillo, to prevent being sunk by strong winds and rough seas, and water sports were suspended in Acapulco. Ports in Chiapas were also closed because of the storm.

== Impact and aftermath ==
=== Central America ===
The precursor disturbance brought light to moderate rainfall to El Salvador. Many homes were damaged, roads were flooded, and several trees were downed. A 44-year-old woman died when a tree fell on her. Strong winds and high waves damaged four homes in Barrio Playa, in the municipality of Acajutla. As a result, shelters were opened, though only seven people sought refuge in them. This same disturbance brought landslides to Guatemala; consequently, 30 people moved to shelters.

=== Mexico ===
Hurricane Barbara moving inland Mexico

Starting early on May 29, the outer rainbands of Tropical Storm Barbara brought torrential rains to several states and power outages to Oaxaca, Chiapas, Guerrero, and Veracruz. Rainfall in the country peaked at 19 in (470 mm). In Ocosingo, 10 in (220.5 mm) fell in a 24‑hour period. Upon making landfall, Barbara struck a largely undeveloped stretch of coastal lagoons, containing small fishing villages. In Acapulco, however, torrential rains caused severe flooding on roads leading to resorts, while damaging some highways. In all, considerable damage was reported.

Four people were killed in Oaxaca. A 61-year-old American drowned offshore from rough seas. A 26-year-old man died from drowning after attempting to cross a river. The third death was a 60-year-old man in Salina Cruz. Furthermore, 14 fishermen went missing off the coast of Tapanatepec two of which were quickly found alive. Within a few days following Barbara, eight of the remaining missing had been found alive. Of the four fishermen still unaccounted for, one was presumed to have died. The towns of Tonala and Arriaga were the worst affected by the hurricane, where dozens of trees, poles, billboards and roofs were damaged due to strong winds. Many restaurants were also destroyed because of high waves. Several homes were flooded. Many homes were destroyed, leaving many homeless. Throughout the rest of Chiapas, however, damage was minor. Statewide, 50 people were evacuated and 2,000 homes were damaged. Throughout the region, 57,000 people were homeless and 10,000 ha (25,000 acres) of crops were destroyed. Approximately 3,500 ha (8,600 acres) of mango crops, accounting for a total yield of 22,751.88 t (50,159,300 lb) of mangoes, were destroyed, with losses estimated at 1.89 billion pesos (US$148 million).

Following the storm, which affected 19,000 people, 16 medical centers were opened, containing a combined 127 doctors and 318 nurses to provide medical care to devastated municipalities. A state of emergency was declared for 36 municipalities in Chiapas and for 5 municipalities in Oaxaca.

== See also ==
- 2013 Pacific hurricane season
- Timeline of the 2013 Pacific hurricane season
- Other storms of the same name
- Hurricane Carlotta (2012)
- Tropical Storm Boris (2014)
- Hurricane Agatha (2022)
