= 2007 Pacific hurricane season =

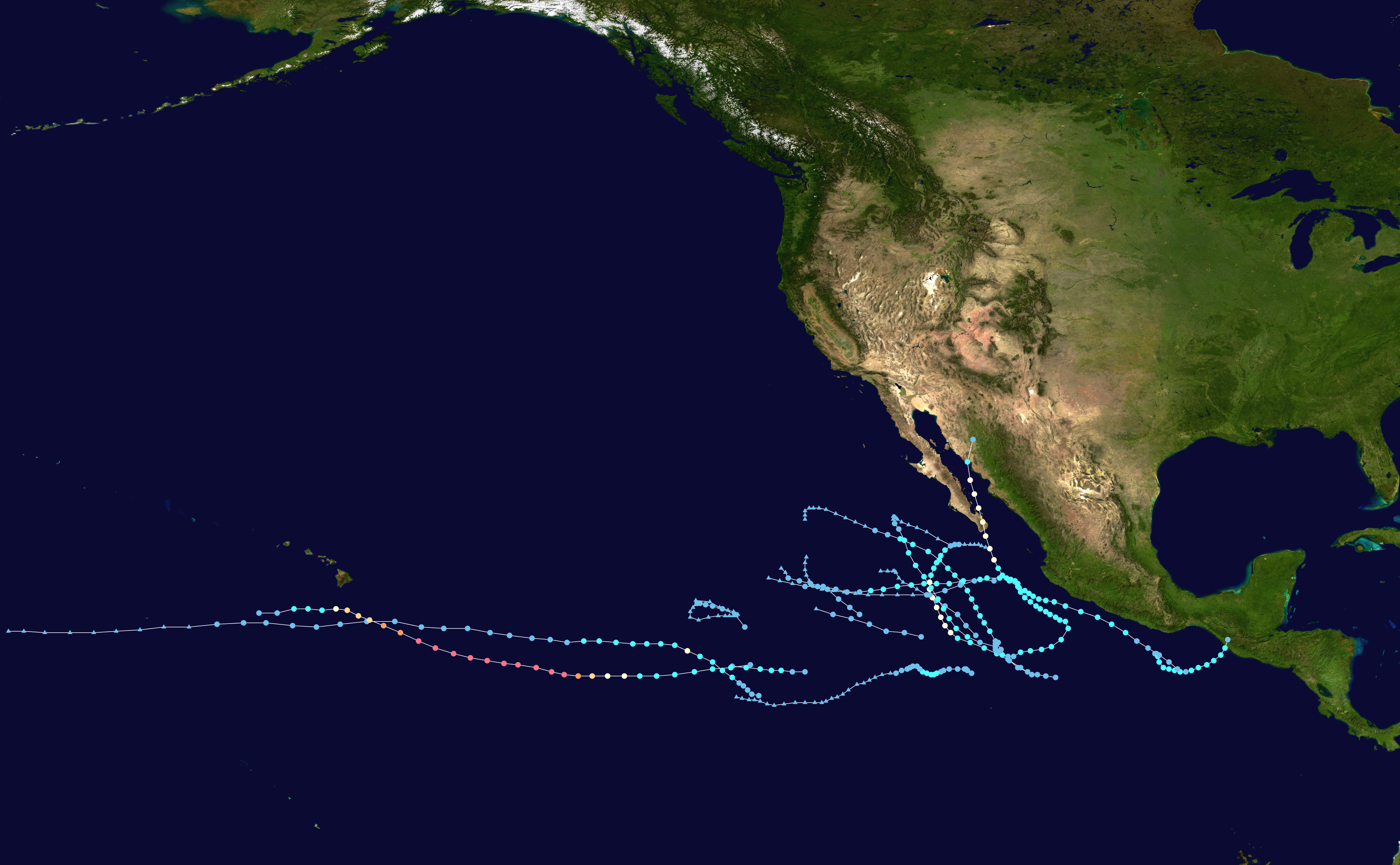
- Season summary map

Seasonal boundaries
- First system formed: May 27, 2007
- Last system dissipated: October 23, 2007

Strongest storm
- Name: Flossie
  - Maximum winds: 140 mph (220 km/h) (1-minute sustained)
  - Lowest pressure: 949 mbar (hPa; 28.02 inHg)

Seasonal statistics
- Total depressions: 15
- Total storms: 11
- Hurricanes: 4
- Major hurricanes (Cat. 3+): 1
- ACE: 52.6
- Total fatalities: 42 total
- Total damage: $81.08 million (2007 USD)

Related articles
- 2007 Atlantic hurricane season; 2007 Pacific typhoon season; 2007 North Indian Ocean cyclone season

The 2007 Pacific hurricane season was a well below-average Pacific hurricane season, featuring only one major hurricane. The season officially started on May 15 in the eastern Pacific and on June 1 in the central Pacific, and ended on November 30; these dates conventionally delimit the period during which most tropical cyclones form in the region. The first tropical cyclone of the season, Alvin, developed on May 27, while the final system of the year, Kiko, dissipated on October 23. Due to unusually strong wind shear, activity fell short of the long-term average, with a total of 11 named storms, 4 hurricanes, and 1 major hurricane. At the time, 2007 featured the second-lowest value of the Accumulated cyclone energy (ACE) index since reliable records began in 1971. Two tropical cyclones – Cosme and Flossie – crossed into the central Pacific basin during the year, activity below the average of 4 to 5 systems.

Impact during the season was relatively minimal. In early June, Tropical Storm Barbara moved ashore just northwest of the Mexico–Guatemala border, causing $55 million (2007 USD) (Note: All damage totals are in 2007 USD unless otherwise stated.) in damage and 4 deaths. In late July, Cosme passed south of the island of Hawaii as a weakening tropical depression; light rain and increased surf resulted. A few days later, Dalila passed offshore the coastline of southwestern Mexico, killing 11 and causing minimal damage. Hurricane Flossie followed a similar track to Cosme in mid-August, producing gusty winds and light precipitation in Hawaii. Hurricane Henriette in early September produced torrential rainfall in southwestern Mexico, killing 6 and causing $25 million in damage. Baja California received moderate rains from Hurricane Ivo in mid-September, though no damage nor fatalities were reported. In mid-October, Tropical Storm Kiko passed just offshore the coastline of southwestern Mexico. Though no deaths were reported on the Mexico mainland, the storm capsized a ship with 30 people on board, 15 of whom were recovered dead, and 9 of whom were reported missing. Overall, the season ended with $80 million in damage and 49 deaths.

== Seasonal forecasts ==
Predictions of tropical activity in the 2007 season
Source	Date	Named storms	Hurricanes	Major hurricanes	Ref
Average (1971–2006)		15.3	8.8	4.2
Record high activity		27	16 (tie)	11
Record low activity		8 (tie)	3	0† (tie)
CPC	May 23, 2007	11-16	6-9	2-4
	Actual activity	11	4	1

On May 21, 2007, the National Oceanic and Atmospheric Administration's Central Pacific Hurricane Center released its outlook for the 2007 Central Pacific hurricane season, predicting a total of 2–3 tropical cyclones to form or cross into the basin; in a typical season, 4–5 systems cross or form in the Central Pacific. A day later, the National Oceanic and Atmospheric Administration's Climate Prediction Center released its seasonal prediction for the 2007 East Pacific hurricane season, predicting a total of 11–16 named storms, 6–9 hurricanes, and 2–4 major hurricanes. Below-average activity was expected as a result of either ENSO-Neutral or La Niña conditions, as well as the continuation of the reduction in activity beginning in 1995.

== Seasonal summary ==
Least intense Pacific hurricane seasons
Rank	Season	ACE value
1	1977	22.3
2	2010	51.2
3	2007	51.6
4	1996	53.9
5	2003	56.6
6	1979	57.4
7	2004	71.1
8	1981	72.8
9	2013	74.8
10	2020	77.3

The Accumulated Cyclone Energy (ACE) index for the 2007 Pacific hurricane season (Eastern Pacific and Central Pacific combined) as calculated by Colorado State University using data from the National Hurricane Center was 51.6 units, (Note: The total represents the sum of the squares of the maximum sustained wind speed (knots) for every (sub)tropical storm's intensity of over 33 knots (38 mph; 61 km/h), divided by 10,000 while they are above that threshold; therefore, tropical depressions are not included.) which was a well below the 1981–2010 average of 113.3 units, and at the time the second-lowest value observed since reliable records began in 1971. Broadly speaking, ACE is a measure of the power of a tropical or subtropical storm multiplied by the length of time it existed. It is only calculated for full advisories on specific tropical and subtropical systems reaching or exceeding wind speeds of 39 mph (63 km/h).

Tropical cyclone activity totaled to eleven named storms, four hurricanes, and only major hurricane within the season; all three of these values fall below the 1971–2006 long-term average of 15 named storms, 9 hurricanes, and 4 major hurricanes. The main contributing factor to below-average activity was much above-average wind shear across the Pacific basin. In May 2007, two tropical storms – Alvin and Barbara – developed, marking at the time the third such instance of more than one tropical storm developing within the month since official records began in 1949. In June 2007, only one tropical depression developed in the East Pacific basin, making 2007 one of only four years in which a tropical storm did not form in the month. By the following month, in terms of ACE, 2007 was considered the third quietest year-to-date since the satellite era began in 1966; in September, the season fell to the second quietest year-to-date. Below-average activity continued for the remainder of the year.

== Systems ==
=== Tropical Storm Alvin ===
- Tropical storm (SSHWS)
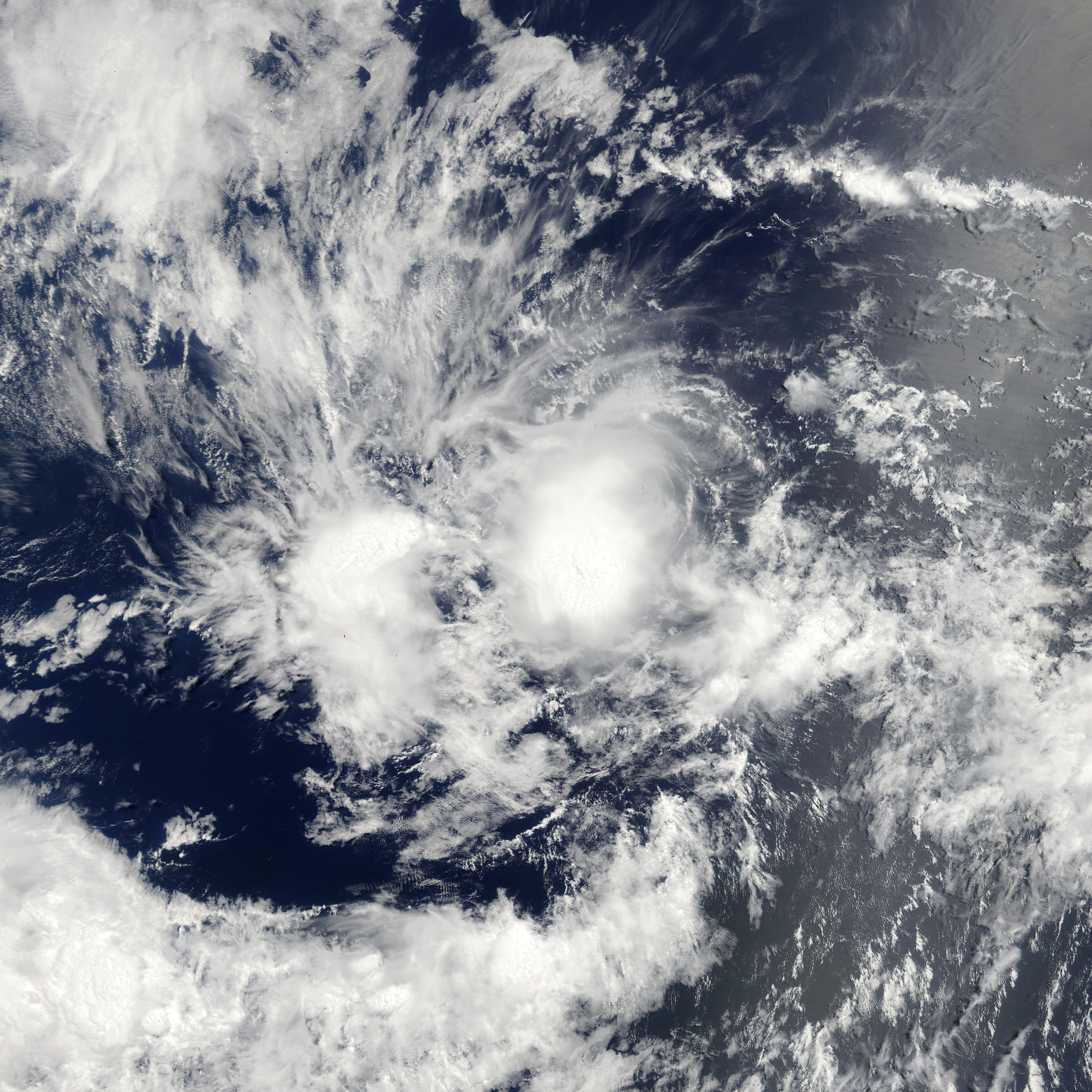
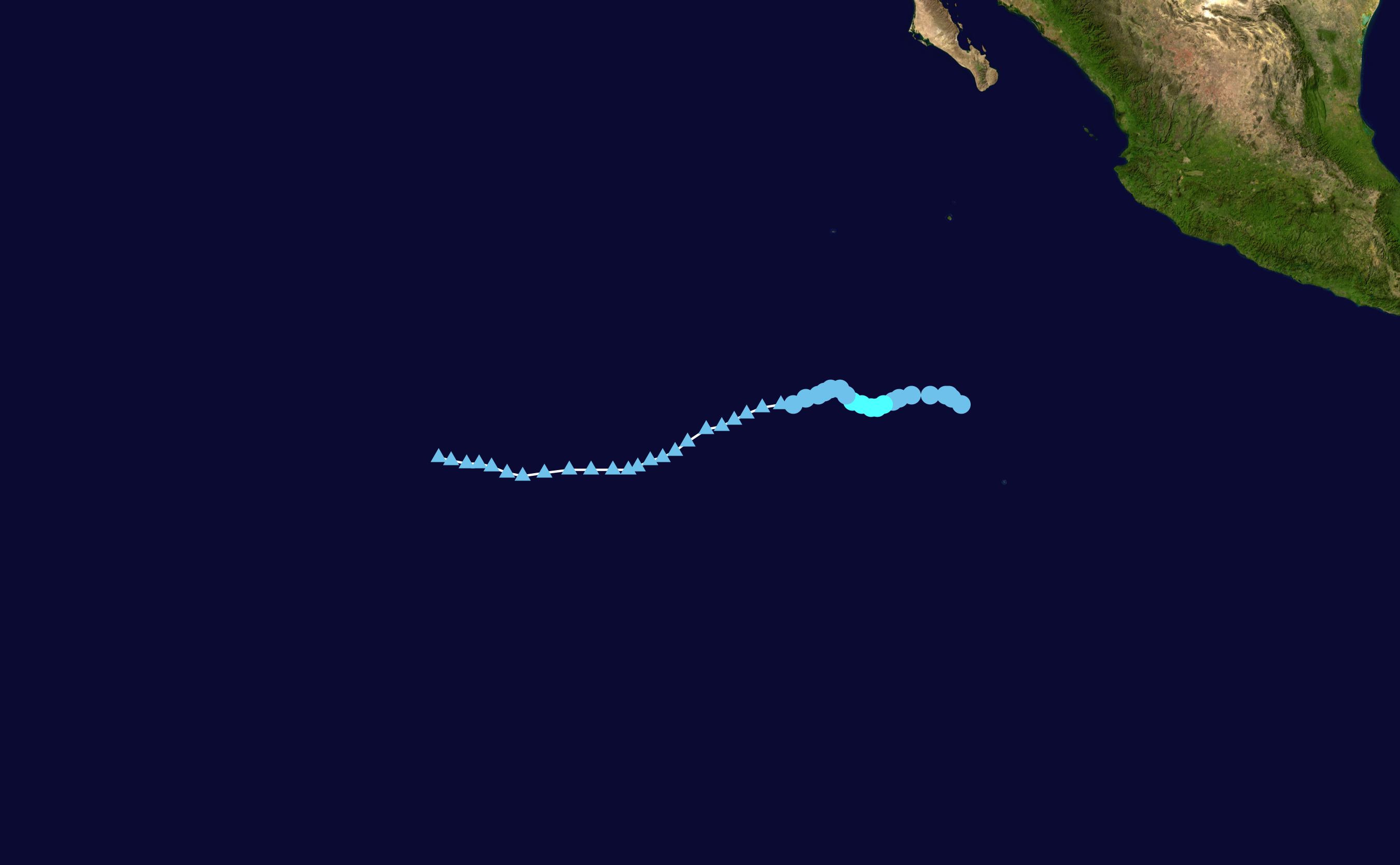
- Duration: May 27 – May 31
- Peak intensity: 40 mph (65 km/h) (1-min); 1003 mbar (hPa)

The genesis of Alvin can be attributed to a tropical wave that crossed Dakar, Africa on May 9. The wave remained poorly organized as it moved across the Atlantic Ocean and Caribbean Sea through mid-May. On May 20, the disturbance crossed Central America and emerged into the eastern Pacific Ocean, where convection—shower and thunderstorm activity—gradually began to increase over the well-defined center; this led to the formation of a tropical depression by 0000 UTC on May 27, approximately 345 mi (555 km) south of the southern tip of Baja California. Following designation, the depression was slow to organize as a result of moderate easterly shear; by 0000 UTC on May 29, however, the system had gained enough organization to be considered a tropical storm. After attaining its peak intensity with winds of 40 mph (64 km/h) and a minimum barometric pressure of 1003 mbar (1003 hPa; 29.6 inHg), increasingly stable air and higher wind shear caused Alvin to begin a weakening trend. At 0600 UTC on May 30, it weakened to a tropical depression, and by 0000 UTC on June 1, Alvin degenerated into a non-convective remnant low. The remnant low continued generally westward until dissipation six days later.

=== Tropical Storm Barbara ===
- Tropical storm (SSHWS)
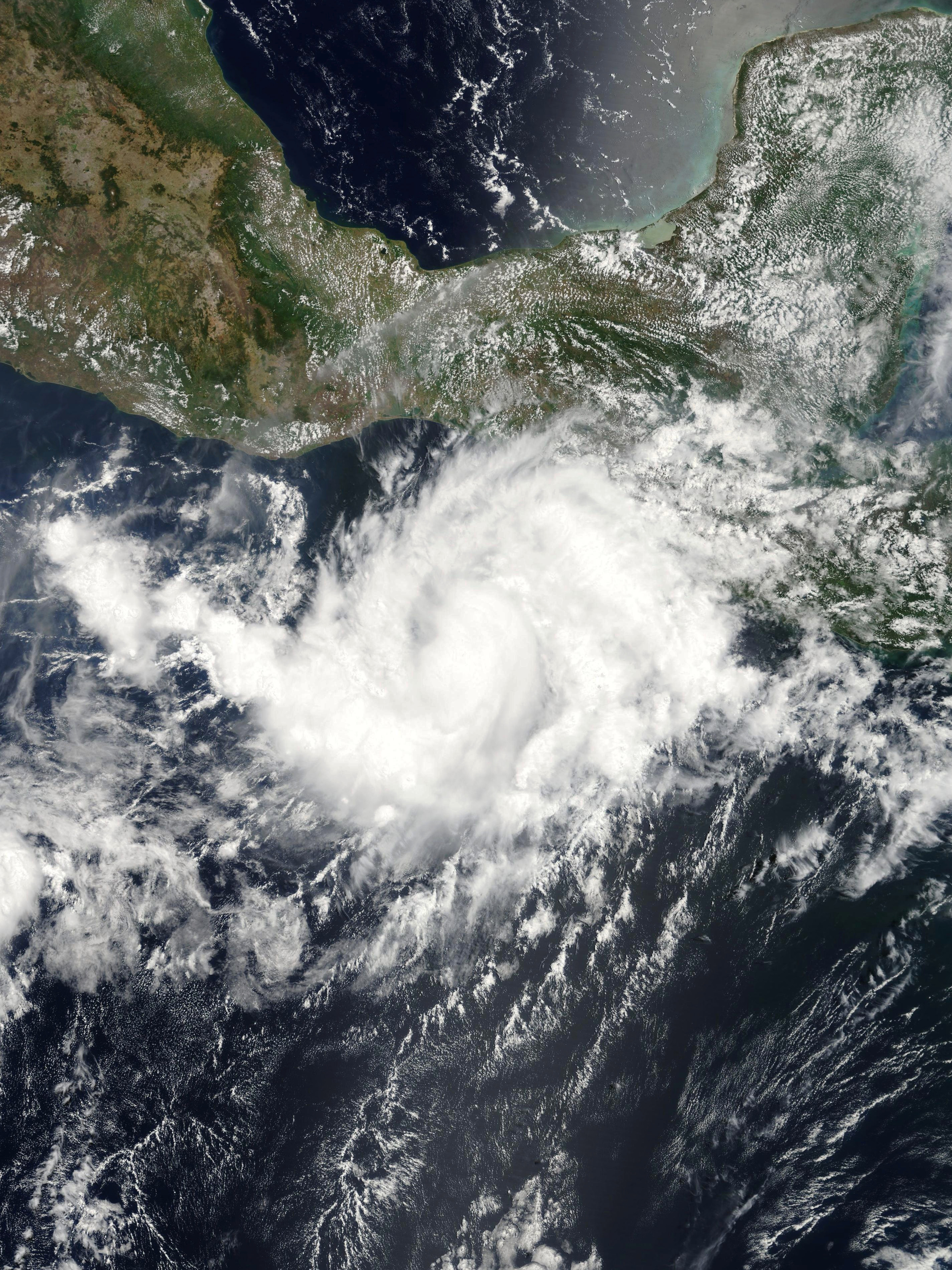
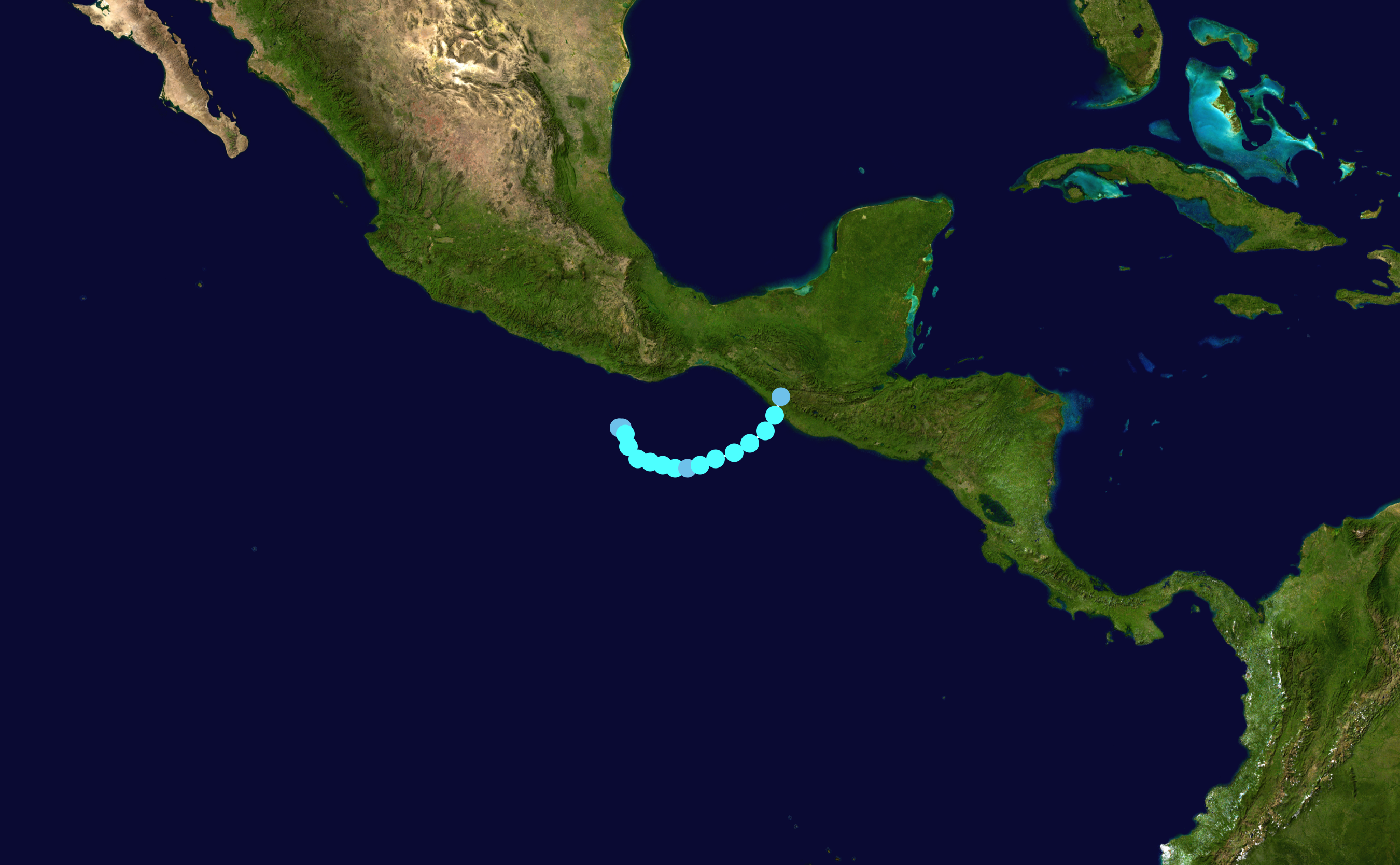
- Duration: May 29 – June 2
- Peak intensity: 50 mph (85 km/h) (1-min); 1000 mbar (hPa)

A tropical wave emerged off the western coast of Africa on May 14. After emerging into the eastern Pacific on May 25, the system acquired enough organization to be considered a tropical depression at 1800 UTC on May 29, about 115 mi (185 km) south-southeast of Puerto Escondido, Oaxaca. Within an environment of weak steering currents, the storm became better organized as evidenced by an improving satellite appearance, with the formation of a curved band in the southeast quadrant. At 1200 UTC on May 30, the depression was upgraded to a tropical storm; by 0000 UTC on June 1, however, increased northerly wind shear caused Barbara to weaken back to a tropical depression. After re-intensifying into a tropical storm for a second time six hours later, Barbara attained its peak intensity with winds of 50 mph (80 km/h) and a minimum barometric pressure of 1000 mbar (1000 hPa; 30 inHg) at 1800 UTC. Drifting northeast, the storm maintained this intensity until landfall just northwest of the Mexico-Guatemala border at 1300 UTC on June 2. Rapid weakening ensued thereafter, with the system weakening to a tropical depression at 1800 UTC. The low-level circulation dissipated six hours later, marking the dissipation of Barbara.

Heavy rainfall exceeding 4 in (100 mm) caused many rivers to swell. An unspecified island was separated from the Mexico mainland after the bridge connecting the two was washed away, stranding dozens of families. In El Salvador, significant flooding killed four people. Gusts peaked at 58 mph (93 km/h) at an automated weather station in Puerto Madero, Chiapas. Across the affected regions, these winds caused damage limited to house roofs and trees. Barbara caused severe crop damage totaling to 200 million pesos (2007 MXN; $55 million). About a hundred residents were forced to evacuate after the storm destroyed a dozen palm huts in Guatemala.

=== Tropical Depression Three-E ===
- Tropical depression (SSHWS)
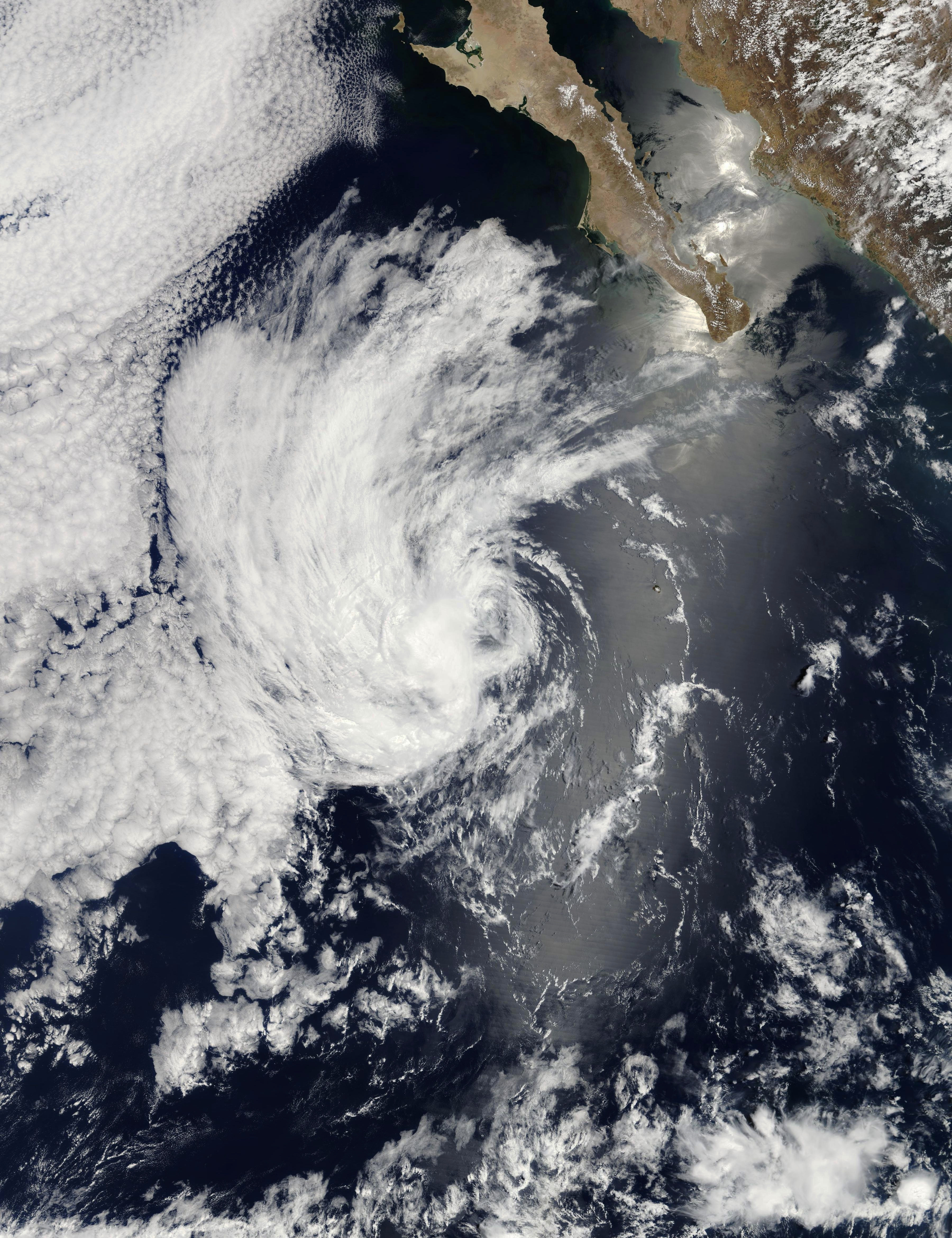
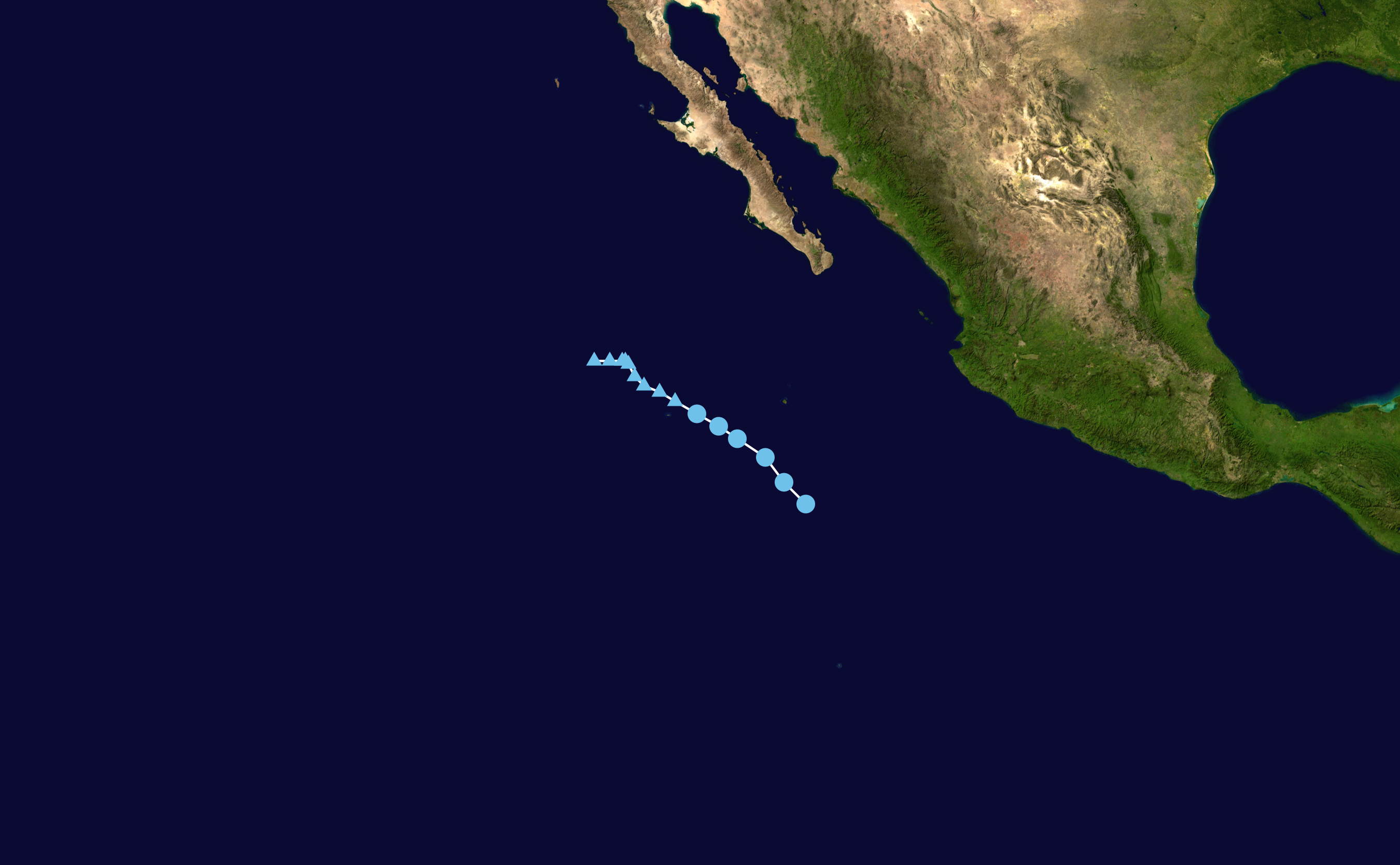
- Duration: June 11 – June 12
- Peak intensity: 35 mph (55 km/h) (1-min); 1004 mbar (hPa)

On May 24, a tropical wave emerged off the western coast of Africa. The wave entered the eastern Pacific around June 6 and shower and thunderstorm activity began to increase shortly thereafter. A broad area of low pressure formed a few hundred miles south of Acapulco, Mexico two days later. Following satellite evidence of a well-defined circulation and organized convective activity, the National Hurricane Center upgraded the disturbance to a tropical depression at 1200 UTC on June 11. After attaining winds of 35 mph (56 km/h) and a minimum barometric pressure of 1004 mbar (1004 hPa; 29.6 inHg), the depression began to traverse cooler waters and much more stable air. This caused all associated convection to fade away, and the depression degenerated to a non-convective remnant low at 0000 UTC on June 13. The remnant low continued northwest until dissipation by 0600 UTC on June 15.

=== Tropical Depression Four-E ===
- Tropical depression (SSHWS)
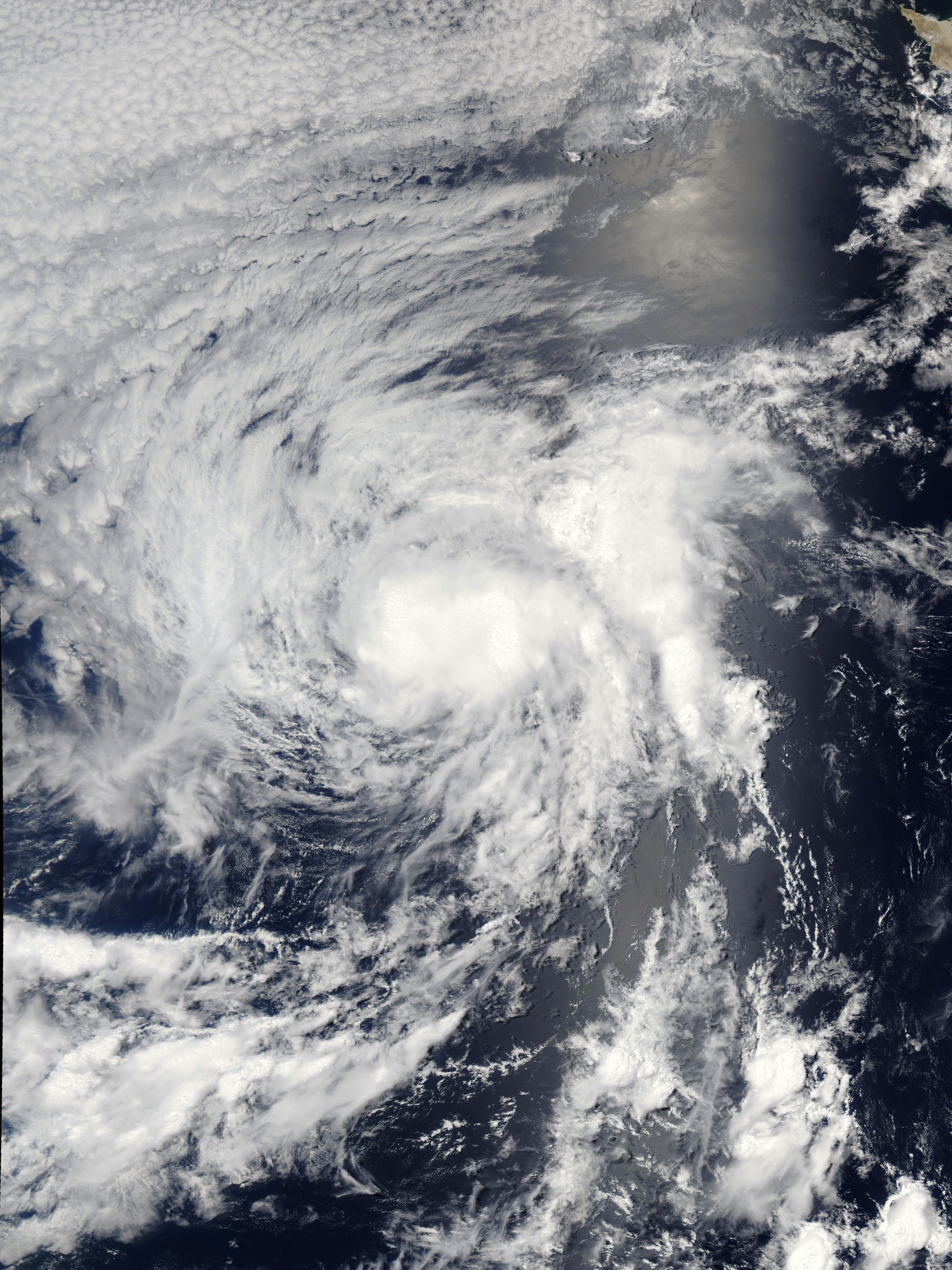
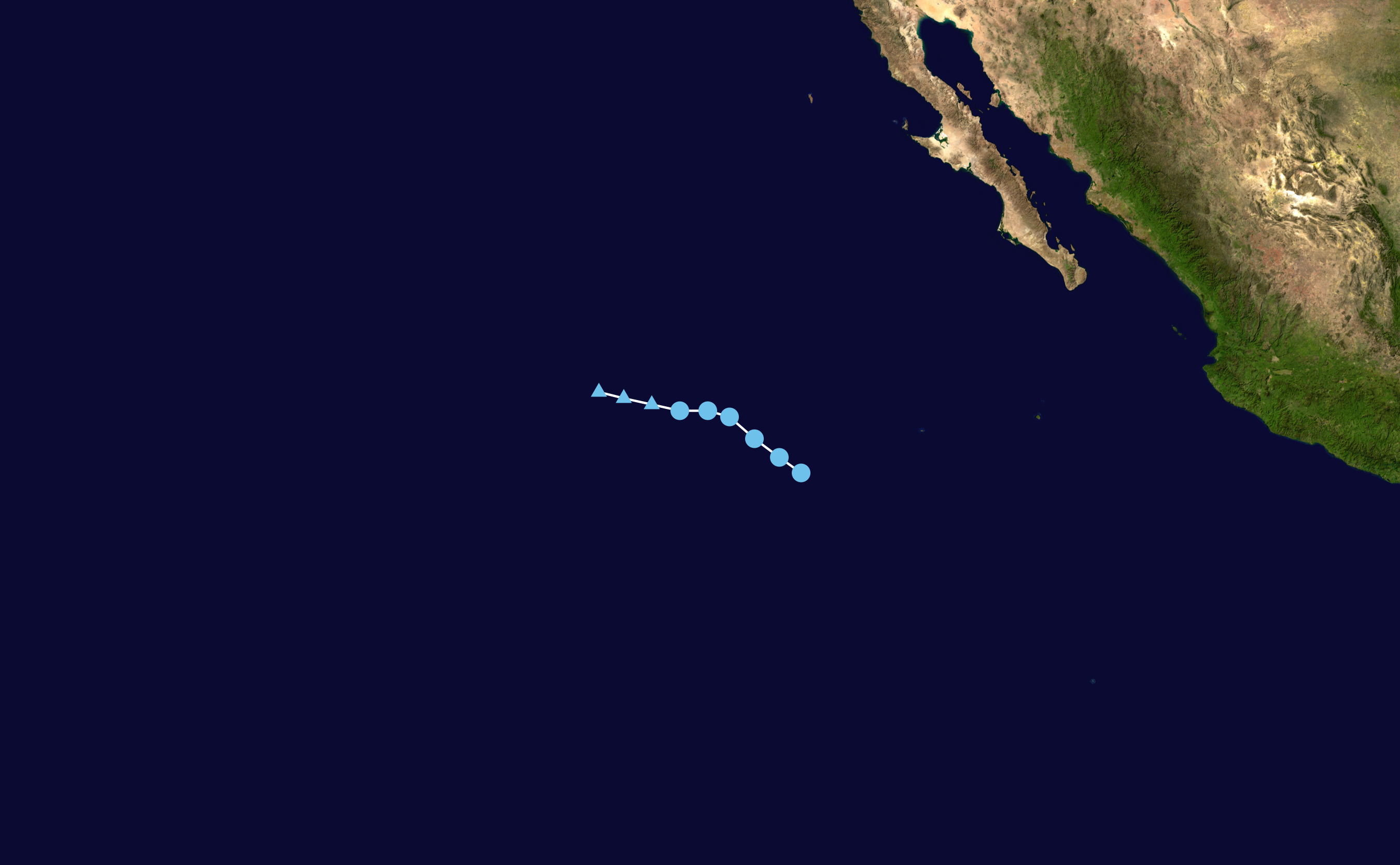
- Duration: July 9 – July 11
- Peak intensity: 35 mph (55 km/h) (1-min); 1006 mbar (hPa)

A tropical wave emerged off the western coast of Africa on June 23. It reached the eastern Pacific on July 3, where associated convection began to increase three days later. Continued slow development occurred thereafter, and following satellite trends, the disturbance was upgraded to Tropical Depression Four-E at 1800 UTC on July 9. Tracking westward, the depression began to move across waters too cool to support a tropical cyclone and into an environment of moderate shear. The low-level circulation became ill-defined and exposed, leading to degeneration to a remnant low at 0600 UTC on July 11 about 910 mi (1,460 km) west-southwest of Cabo San Lucas, Mexico. The low continued northwest until dissipation at 0000 UTC the following day.

=== Tropical Depression Five-E ===
- Tropical depression (SSHWS)
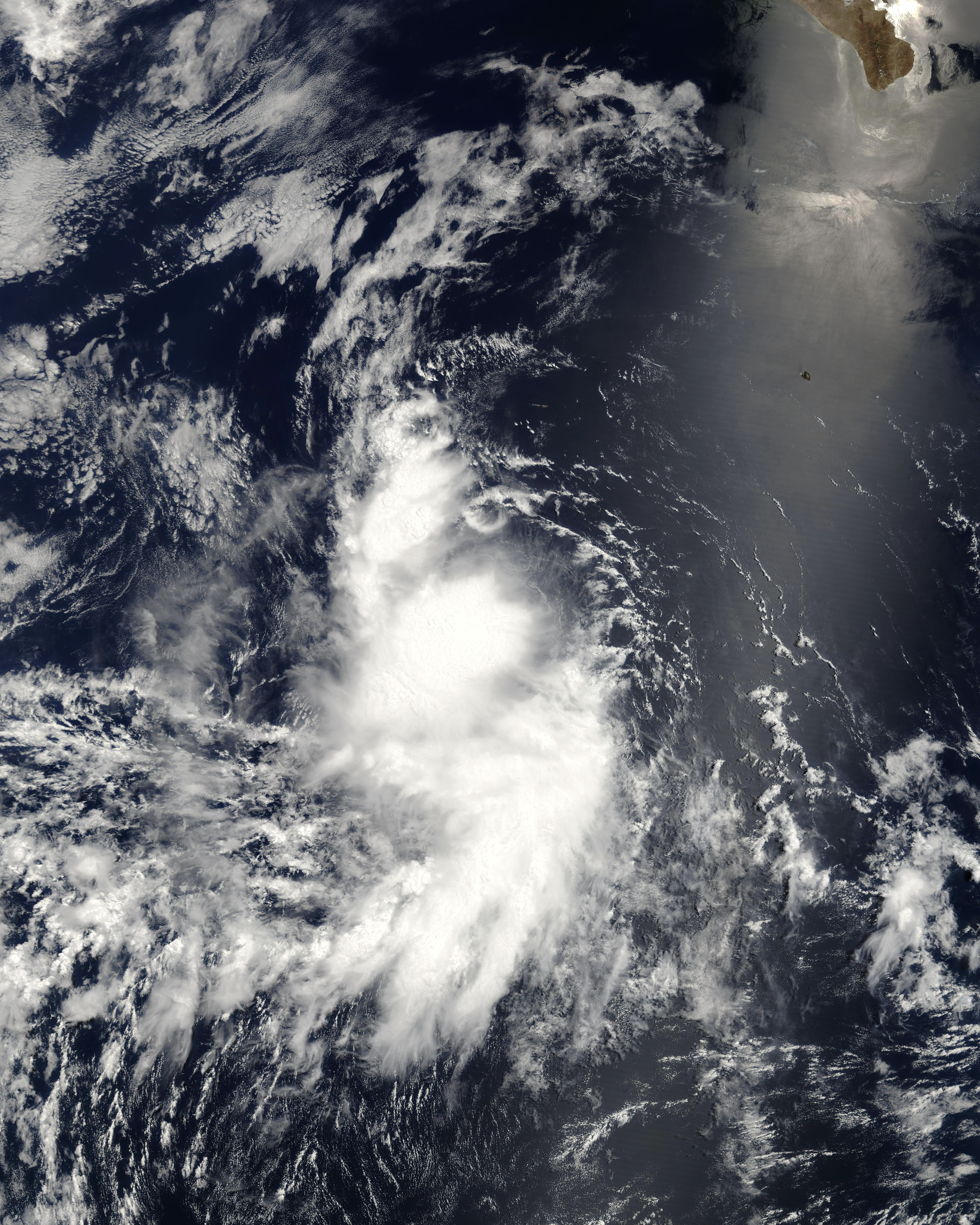
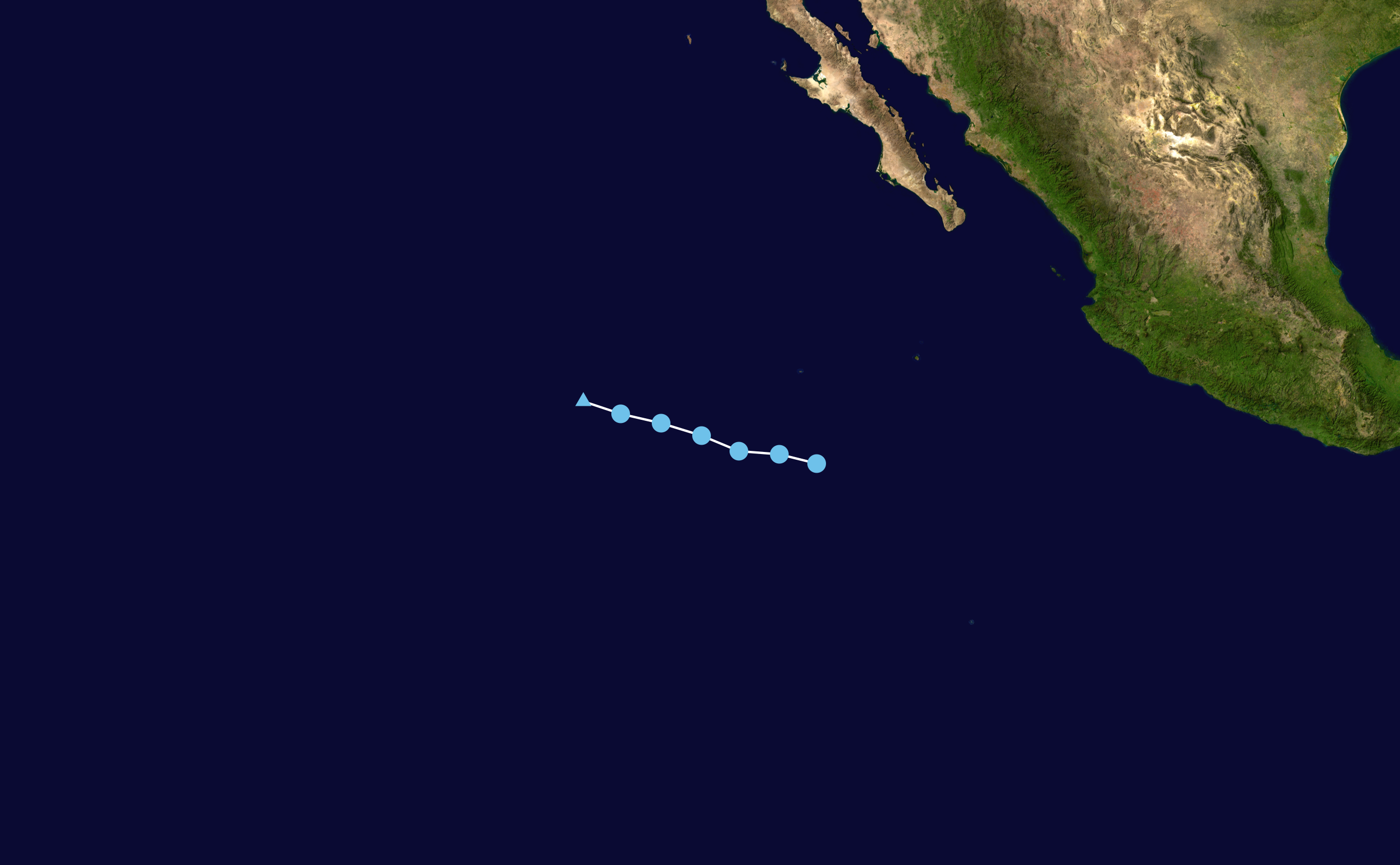
- Duration: July 14 – July 15
- Peak intensity: 35 mph (55 km/h) (1-min); 1006 mbar (hPa)

On June 21, a tropical wave emerged off the western coast of Africa. It entered the eastern Pacific on July 10, and shower and thunderstorm activity began to increase a day later as a result. Tracking westward, the wave gradually became better organized; by 1200 UTC on July 14, the disturbance acquired enough organization to be upgraded to a tropical depression. Within an environment of moderate wind shear, the low-level center quickly became poorly defined as convection dissipated. Turning west-northwest on July 15, the depression entered cooler waters and an increasingly stable airmass, causing the system to degenerate into a remnant low by 0000 UTC the following day. The remnant low dissipated a few hours later.

=== Hurricane Cosme ===
- Category 1 hurricane (SSHWS)
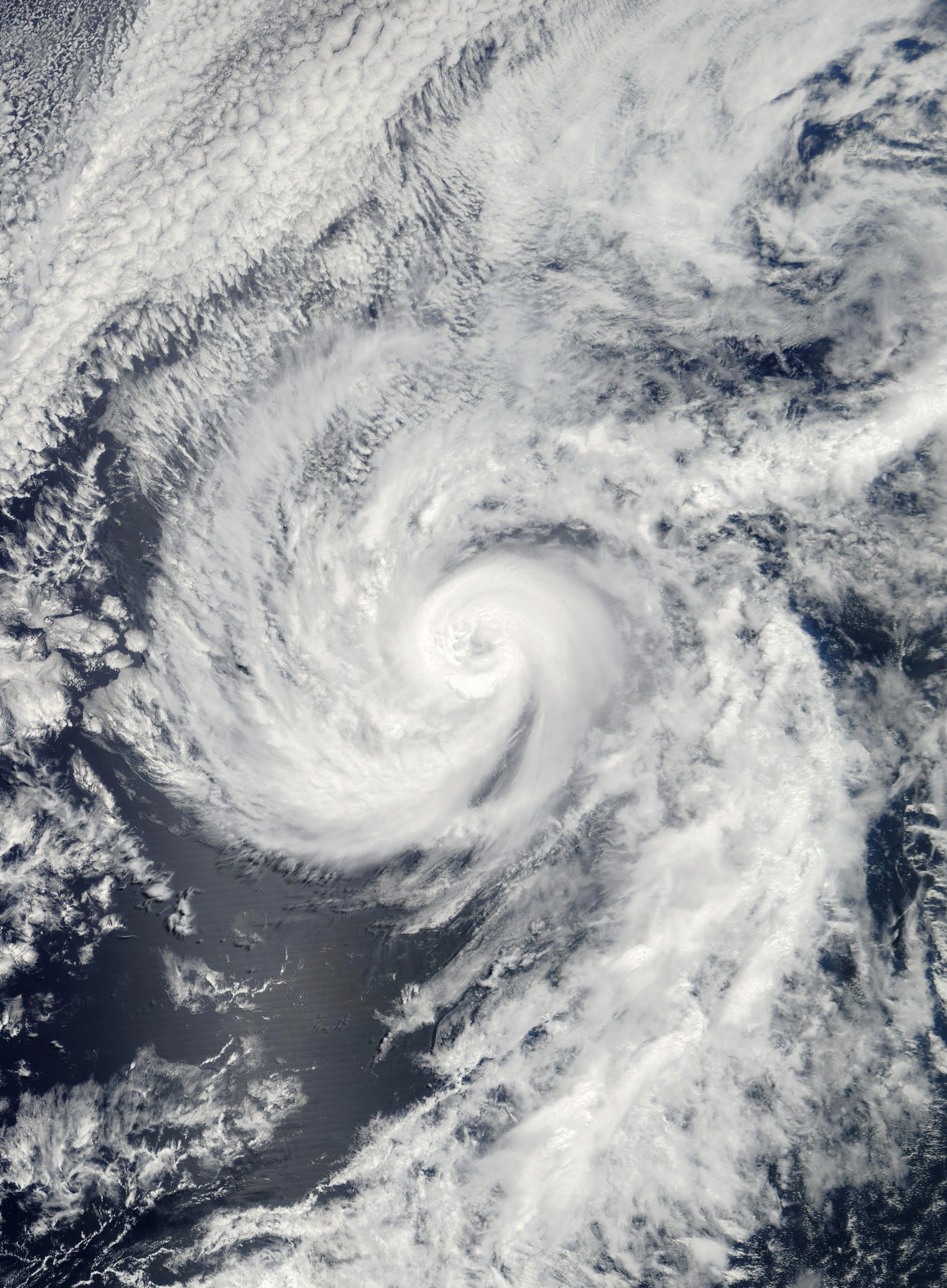
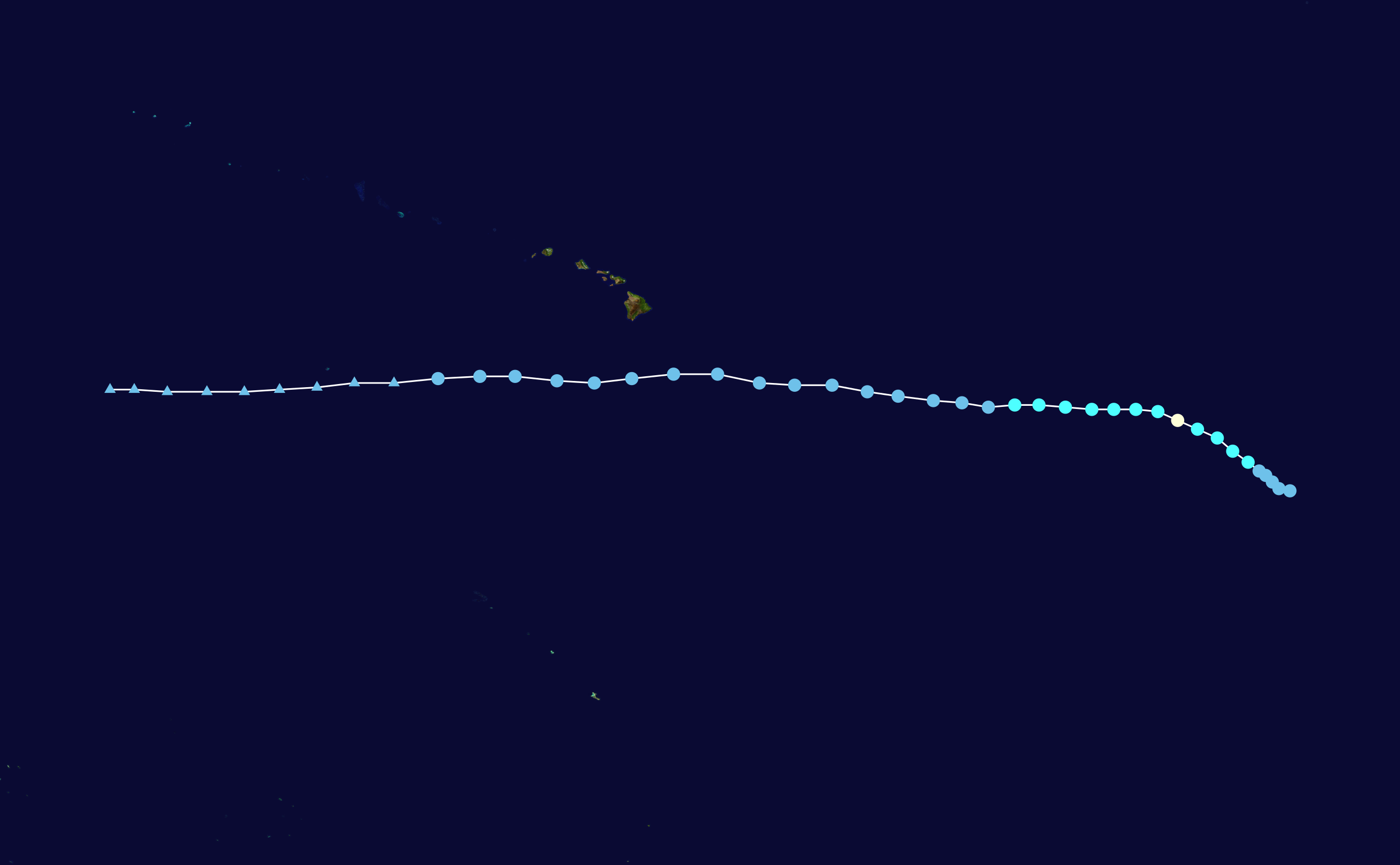
- Duration: July 14 – July 22
- Peak intensity: 75 mph (120 km/h) (1-min); 987 mbar (hPa)

A tropical wave emerged off the western coast of Africa on June 27 and tracked westward to reach the eastern Pacific on July 8. Initially embedded within the ITCZ, development was slow until the system's convection increased on July 13. A day later, the NHC classified it as Tropical Depression Six-E about midway between Mexico and Hawaii. Although wind shear was light, ocean temperatures were marginal for intensification, and the depression intensified into Tropical Storm Cosme on July 15, while moving generally northwestward. Following the development of a curved convection band and appearance of an eye on satellite, Cosme was upgraded to a Category 1 hurricane at 1800 UTC the next day, about 1,600 mi (2,600 km) east of Hilo, Hawaii; it is at this time that the hurricane attained its peak with winds of 75 mph (121 km/h) and a minimum barometric pressure of 987 mbar (987 hPa; 29.1 inHg). Cosme tracked westward over cooler waters, causing the system to weaken quickly back to tropical storm strength. At 1800 UTC on July 18, Cosme weakened to a tropical depression after crossing into the central Pacific. Gradually weakening, Tropical Depression Cosme passed south of the Hawaiian Islands on July 20 with a minimum central pressure of 1010 mbar. By late on July 22, Cosme degenerated into a remnant low near Johnston Island. The circulation dissipated three days later.

Cosme was initially forecast to pass over Hawaii at tropical storm strength. In anticipation of the storm, the National Weather Service issued a flash flood watch for the island of Hawaii on July 20, and a small craft advisory and high surf advisory for Maui and Hawaii. The Hawaii County Civil Defense opened evacuation centers, while county crews cleaned out drains and culverts to prevent flooding. Because the depression stayed far from land, the effects were mostly minor. Rain bands produced 6.94 in (176 mm) of rainfall in Hakalau, causing small stream and drainage ditch flooding, as well as ponding on roadways in portions of Hilo, Puna, and Kau. The rainfall helped to relieve a persistent drought which had existed for several months. Wind gusts reached 40 mph (64 km/h) in southern portions of Hawaii. A strong trade wind swell north of Cosme generated waves up to 9 ft (2.7 m) high.

=== Tropical Storm Dalila ===
- Tropical storm (SSHWS)
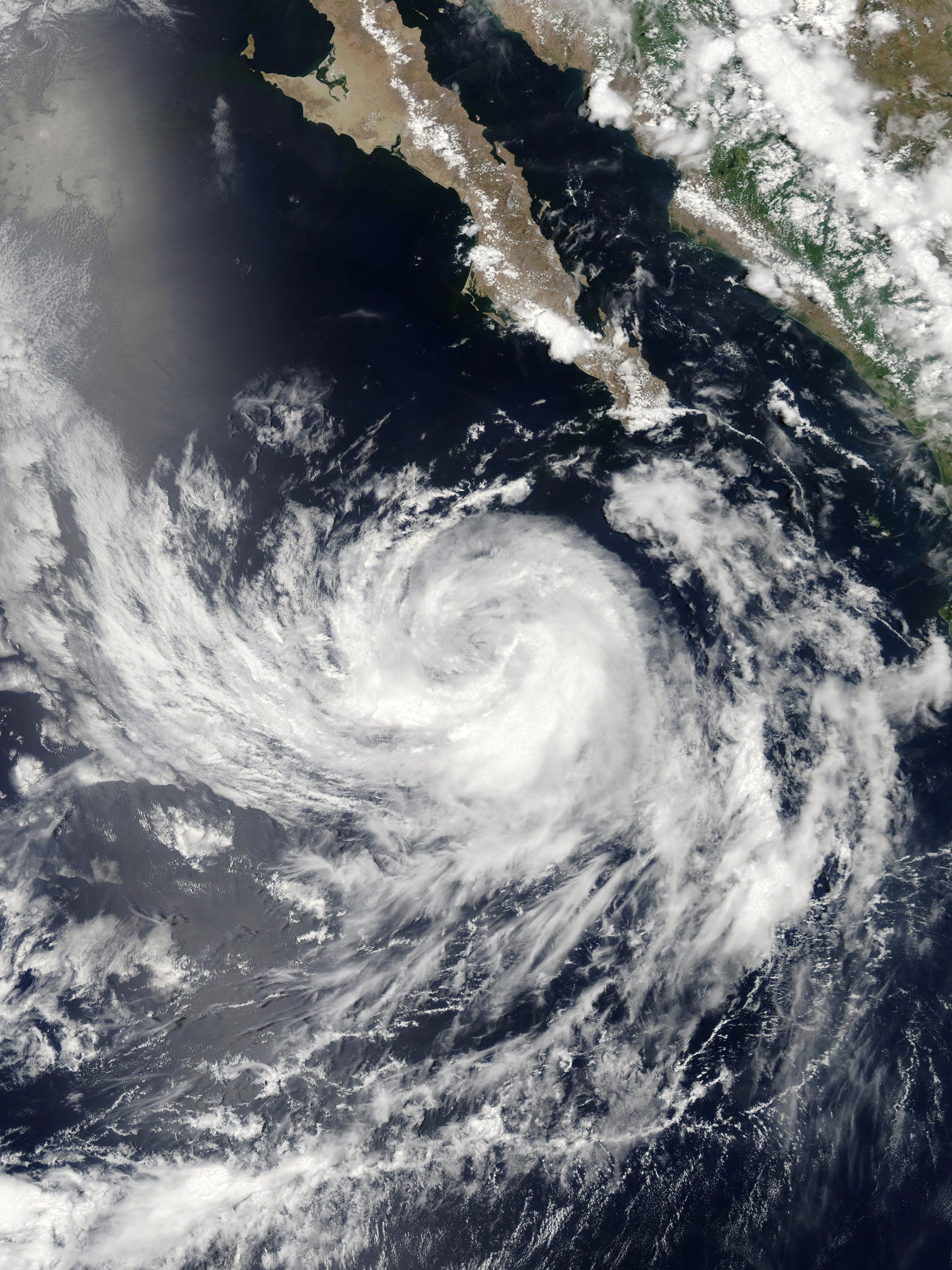
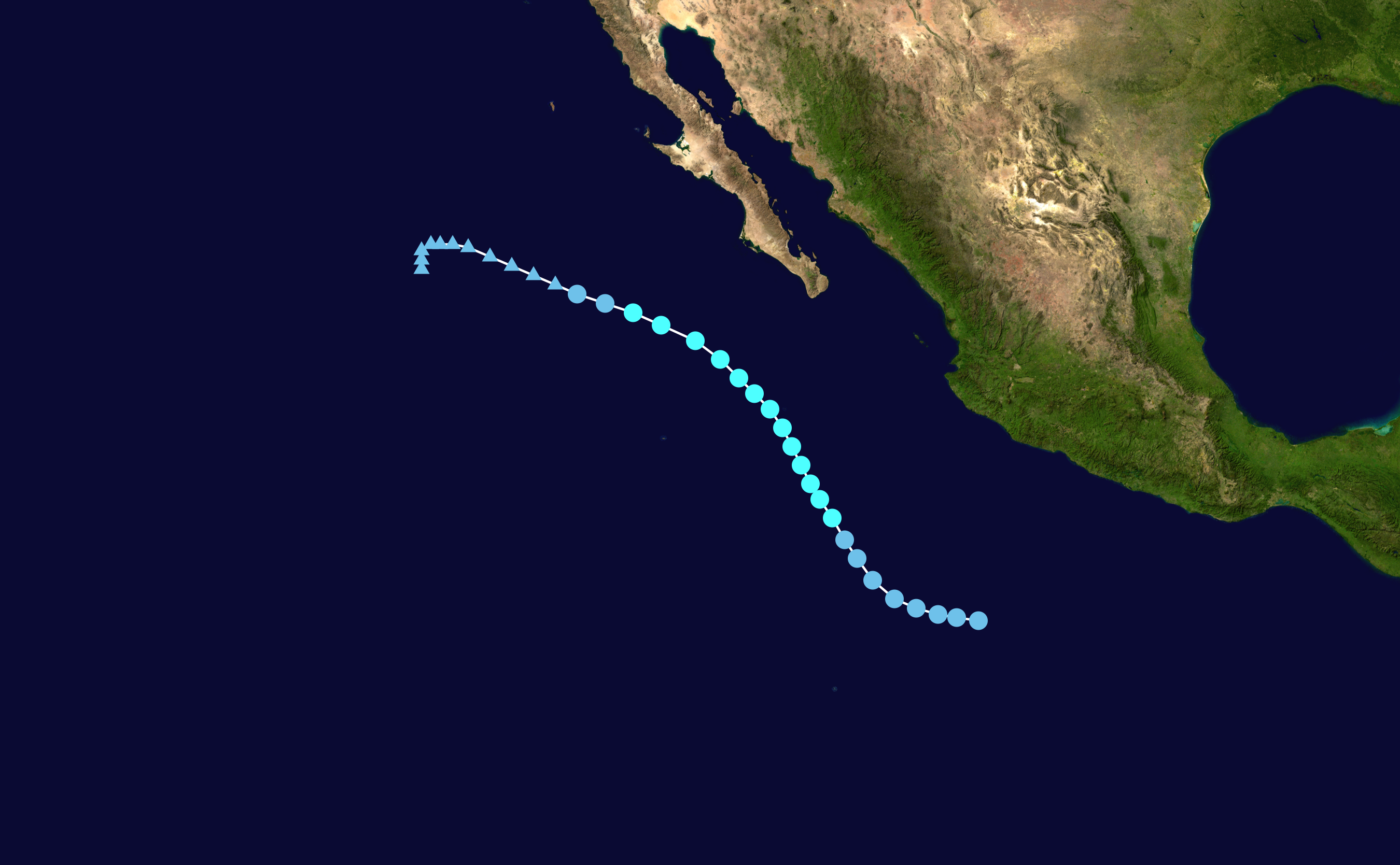
- Duration: July 22 – July 27
- Peak intensity: 60 mph (95 km/h) (1-min); 995 mbar (hPa)

A tropical wave emerged into the eastern Pacific on July 17. Tracking west-northwest, the system acquired enough organization to be upgraded to a tropical depression at 0000 UTC on July 22, while positioned 460 mi (740 km) south of Manzanillo, Mexico. Following formation, moderate northeasterly shear inhibited significant development, causing the system to remain a tropical depression for 48 hours. A mid-level ridge over Mexico caused the system to turn northwest as shear began to decrease; at 0000 UTC on July 24, the depression was upgraded to Tropical Storm Dalila. After attaining its peak intensity with winds of 60 mph (97 km/h) and a minimum barometric pressure of 995 mbar (995 hPa; 29.4 inHg) a day later, the storm tracked over progressively cool waters, causing it to weaken. At 0600 UTC on July 27, Dalila weakened to a tropical storm, and by 1800 UTC, the system no longer retained enough organization to be considered a tropical cyclone. The remnant low tracked west, southwest, and eventually south prior to dissipation at 1200 UTC on July 30.

Though the center of the storm remained offshore, outer rainbands led to heavy rainfall that triggered substantial flooding. In Michoacán, Dalila flooded ten municipalities with at least 15 in (380 mm) of precipitation, destroying dozens of wooden structures. Heavy rains in Jalisco killed eleven, many of whom occurred in automobile crashes. Flood waters covered numerous roads, causing many accidents, while approximately 50 homes were damaged. Rough seas and heavy rain affected Baja California Sur, though no damage or fatalities were reported.

=== Tropical Storm Erick ===
- Tropical storm (SSHWS)
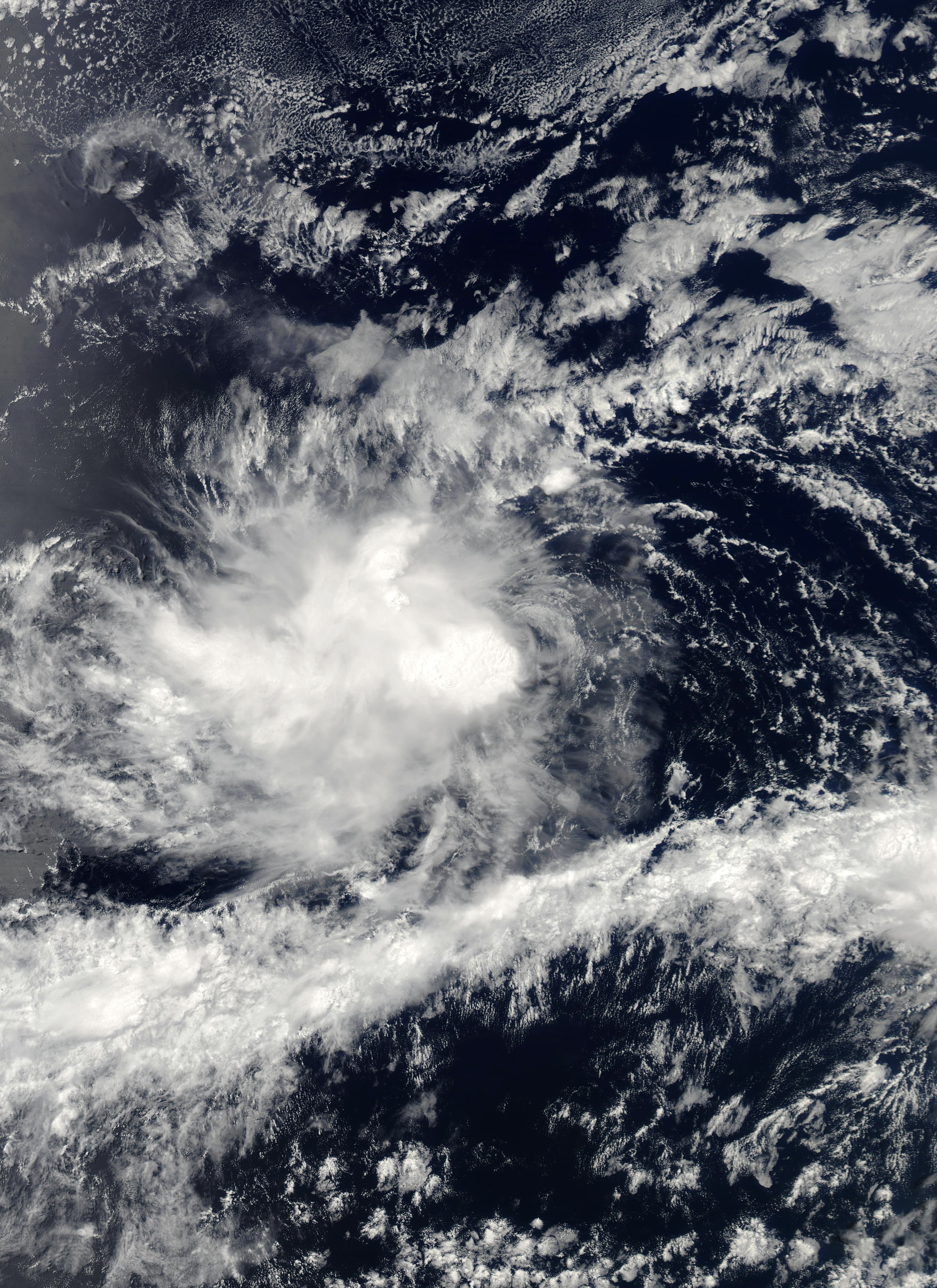
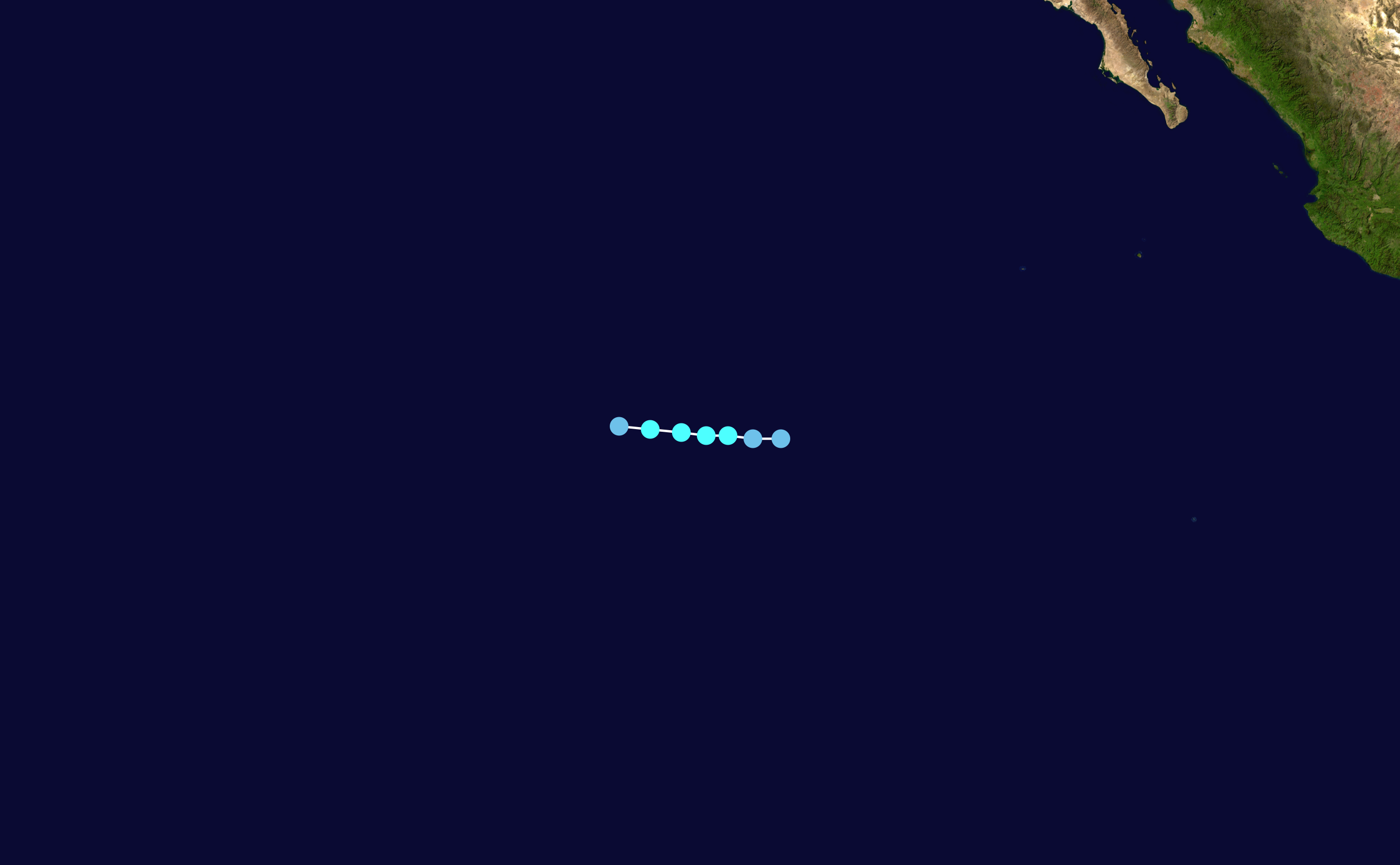
- Duration: July 31 – August 2
- Peak intensity: 40 mph (65 km/h) (1-min); 1004 mbar (hPa)

A tropical wave emerged off the western coast of Africa on July 16. Tracking westward, intermittent bursts of deep convection occurred as it crossed the Leeward Islands on July 22, but associated activity remained disorganized. The wave crossed Central America three days later, emerging into the eastern Pacific Ocean shortly thereafter. On July 28, a broad area of low pressure formed along the wave axis; easterly shear, however, prevented thunderstorms from developing over the center. Convective activity increased by July 31, leading to the formation of a tropical depression at 1200 UTC that day. Despite the unfavorable environment, satellite intensity estimates increased to tropical storm intensity, prompting the National Hurricane Center to upgrade the depression to such. After attained a peak intensity with winds of 40 mph (64 km/h) and a minimum barometric pressure of 1004 mbar (1004 hPa; 29.6 inHg) at 0600 UTC on August 1, continued wind shear caused Erick to weaken to a tropical depression. The low-level center became lost organization as it became elongated northeast to southwest on August 2, leading to degeneration into a tropical wave by 06:00 UTC. The remnants of the system dissipated six hours later.

=== Hurricane Flossie ===
- Category 4 hurricane (SSHWS)
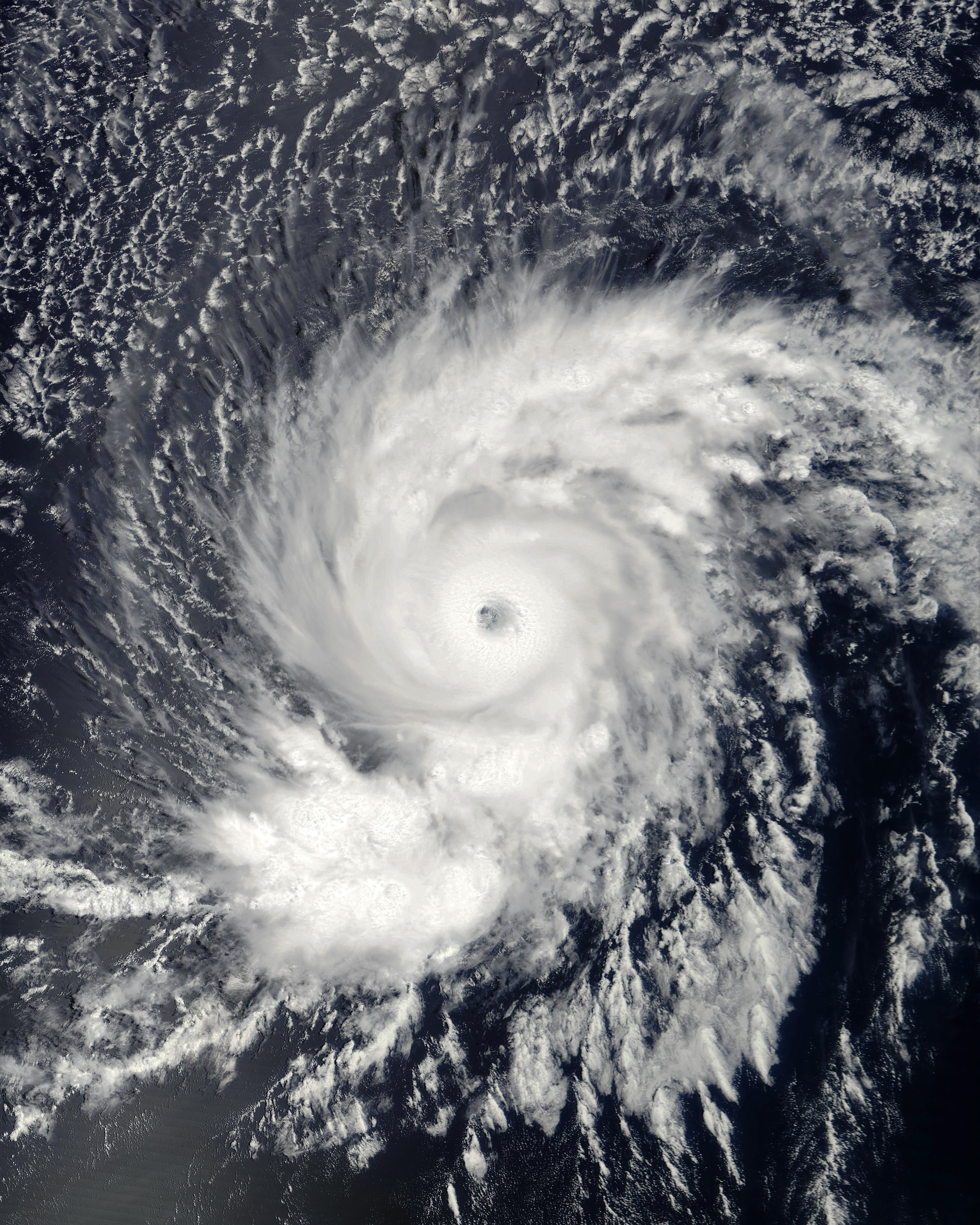
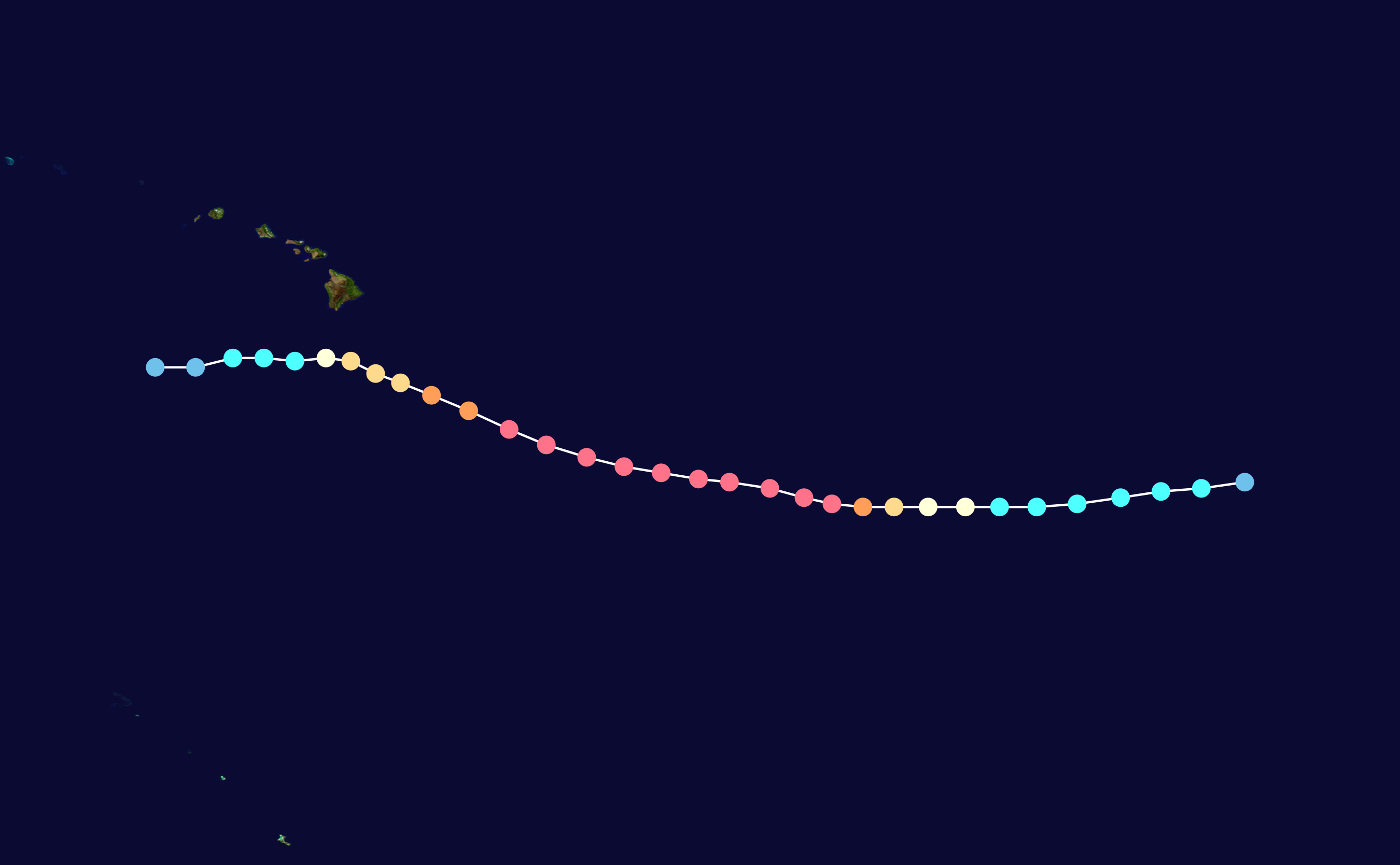
- Duration: August 8 – August 16
- Peak intensity: 140 mph (220 km/h) (1-min); 949 mbar (hPa)

On July 21, a poorly-defined tropical wave exited western Africa and proceeded westward without development. It crossed into the eastern Pacific on August 1, where conditions favored development. The system developed intermittent convection at first as it continued westward. On August 8, it organized into Tropical Depression Six-E while located about 1,700 mi (2,700 km) east-southeast of the Big Island of Hawaii. Low wind shear and warm waters allowed the depression to quickly strengthen. Within six hours of forming, it intensified into Tropical Storm Flossie. The storm's outflow expanded as rainbands spiraled around the center. An eye developed on satellite imagery, and Flossie intensified into a hurricane on August 10. It subsequently rapidly intensified, becoming a major hurricane on August 11. That day, Flossie attained peak winds of 140 mph (220 km/h) and a minimum barometric pressure of 949 mb (hPa; 28.02 inHg), making it a Category 4 hurricane and the strongest storm of the season. It remained at Category 4 intensity for 36 hours. On August 14, cooler water and stronger wind shear caused weakening. That day, it passed south of the Hawaiian Islands as a Category 2 hurricane. Further wind shear eroded the eyewall, and Flossie quickly fell to tropical storm status. It deteriorated into a tropical depression as the thunderstorms diminished. Flossie dissipated on August 16 southwest of Hawaii.

The threat of Flossie led to a hurricane watch and tropical storm warning for the Big Island of Hawaii. The Federal Emergency Management Agency (FEMA) sent 20 transportation, public works, and health experts to the region. Many schools were closed, including the University of Hawaii at Hilo and Hawaii Community College; as a result, an estimated 26,000 college students were sent home. Governor Linda Lingle declared a state of emergency for the Island of Hawaii in advance of the storm. As a weakening cyclone, Flossie produced light precipitation on the island of Hawaii, reaching 2 to 4 in (51 to 102 mm) fell at the Koolau Range on Oahu. Large waves impacted south-facing beaches. Sustained winds reached 39 mph (63 km/h) at South Point. A large lava bench collapsed into the ocean on August 13, which may have been related to the hurricane's passage, or alternatively, a recent 5.4 magnitude earthquake.

=== Tropical Storm Gil ===
- Tropical storm (SSHWS)
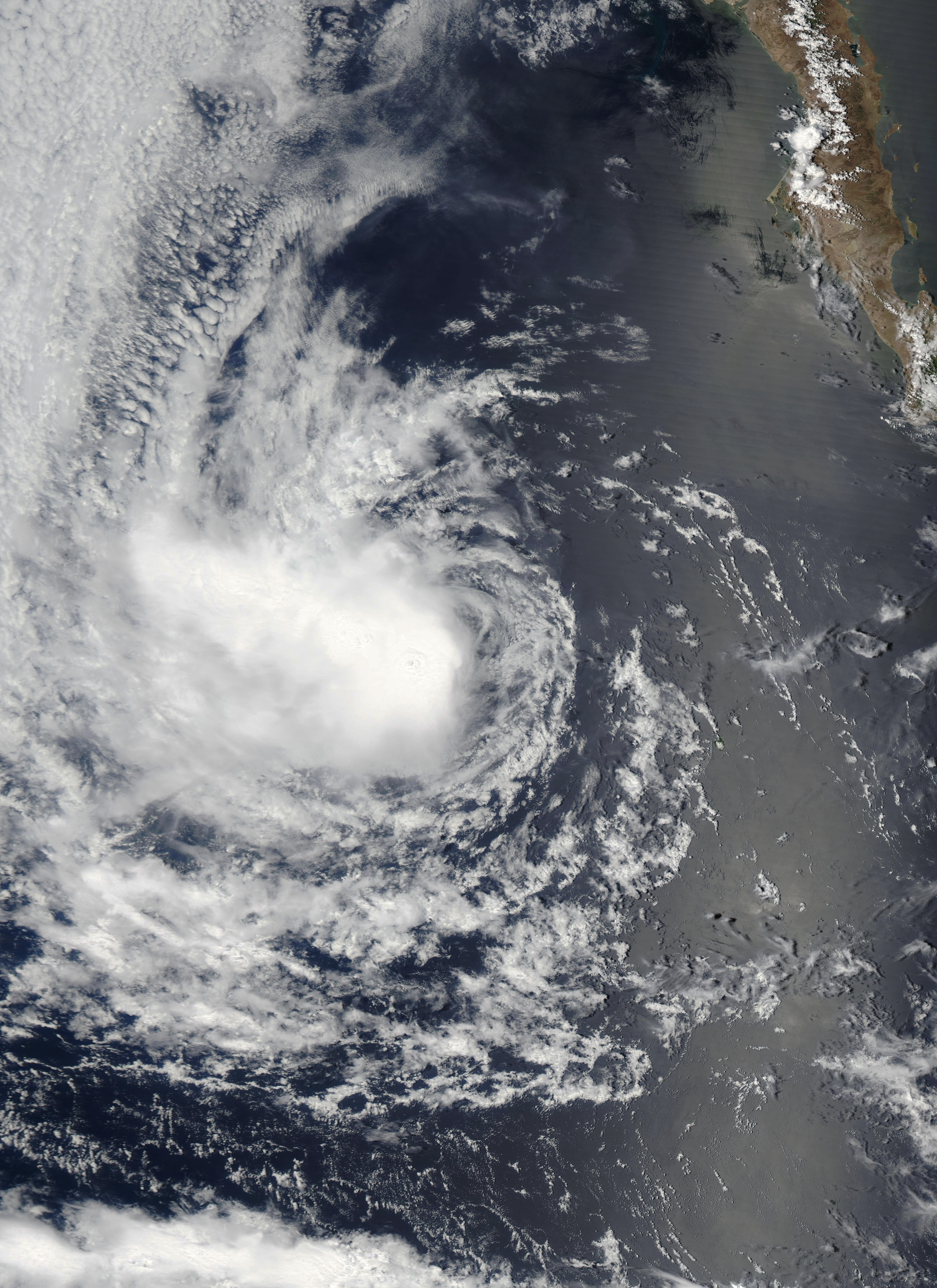
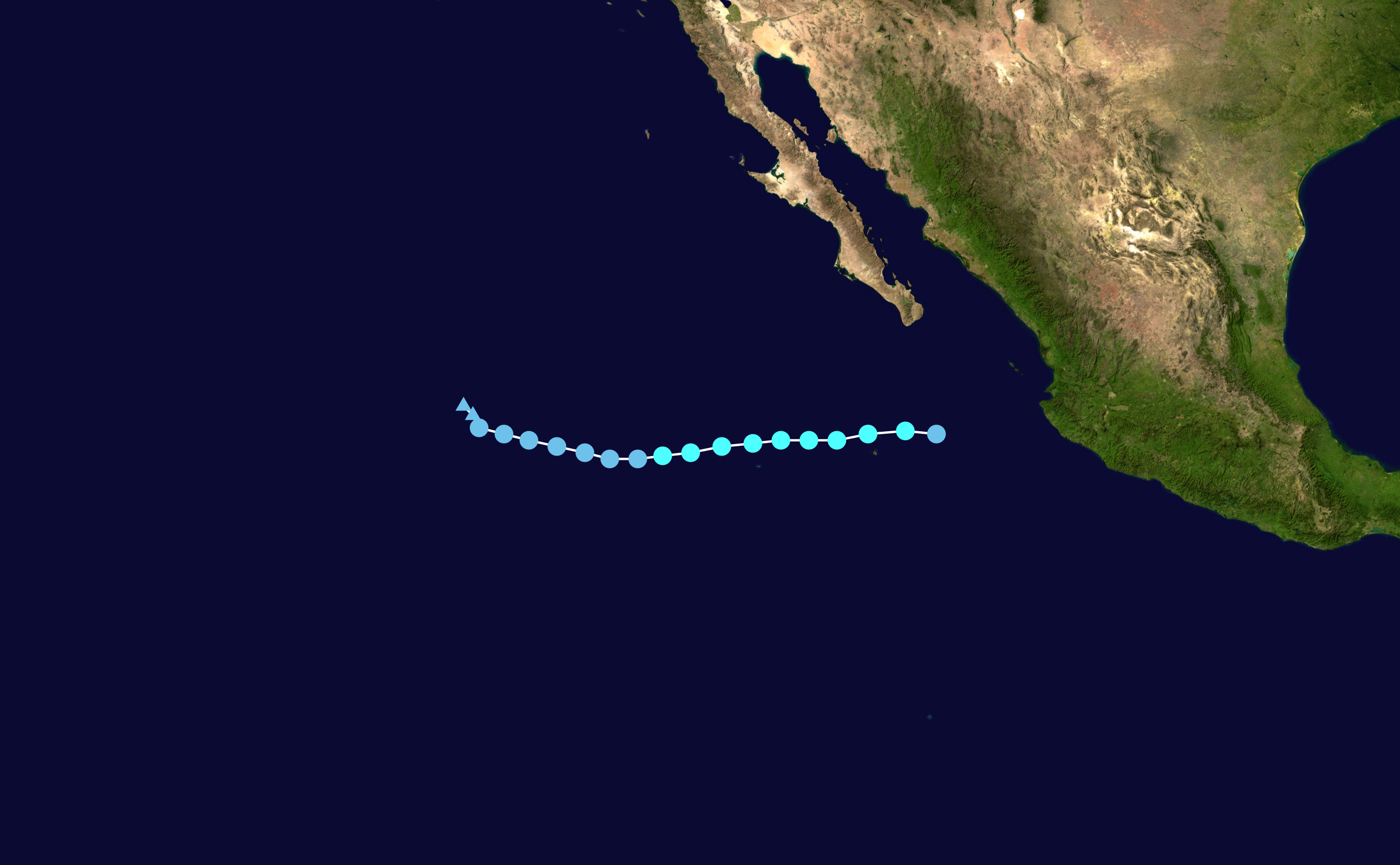
- Duration: August 29 – September 2
- Peak intensity: 45 mph (75 km/h) (1-min); 1001 mbar (hPa)

A vigorous tropical wave emerged off the western coast of Africa on August 16. Characterized with abundant deep convection, the wave remained organization until it interacted with an upper-level trough across the eastern Caribbean Sea a few days later. On August 26, the wave split in two, with the northern portion leading the formation of a weak low in the Bay of Campeche and the southern portion continuing westward into the eastern Pacific. After the formation of deep convection over the center and associated convective bands, the disturbance was upgraded to a tropical depression at 1200 UTC on August 29. Though the circulation remained positioned on the northeast side of most thunderstorm activity, satellite intensity estimates supported tropical storm strength and it was upgraded to such accordingly. At 1200 UTC on August 30, Gil attained its peak intensity with winds of 45 mph (72 km/h) and a minimum barometric pressure of 1001 mbar (1001 hPa; 29.6 inHg). Shortly thereafter, increasing wind shear and decreasing sea surface temperatures caused the system to steadily weaken; at 0000 UTC on September 1, the system deteriorated into a tropical depression, and by 1800 UTC the following afternoon, the system no longer displayed enough organization to be considered a cyclone. The remnant low continued westward and dissipated twelve hours later.

Although the storm never made landfall, heavy rainfall was reported in the Mexican states of Baja California Sur and Sinaloa. A total of 26 neighborhoods were flooded with up to 4.9 ft (1.5 m) of water in the town of Culiacán, while a 14-year-old boy was swept away by a swollen river. At least 100 vehicles were stranded in sectors such as Las Quintas, the city center and Chapultepec, causing severe road congestion. The shuttle service had to be suspended for two hours. Dozens of families were evicted by Civil Protection personnel and municipal police.

=== Hurricane Henriette ===
- Category 1 hurricane (SSHWS)
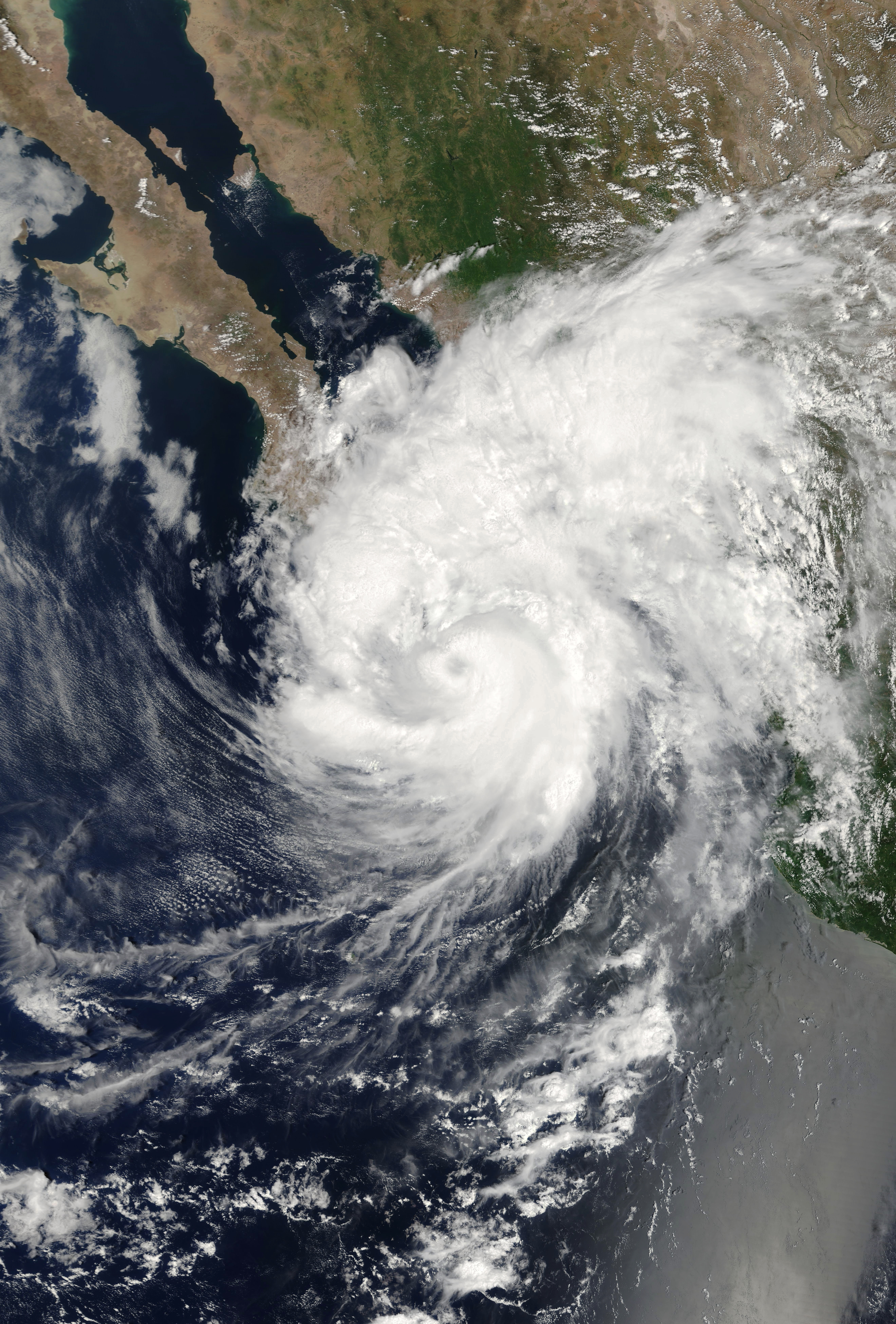
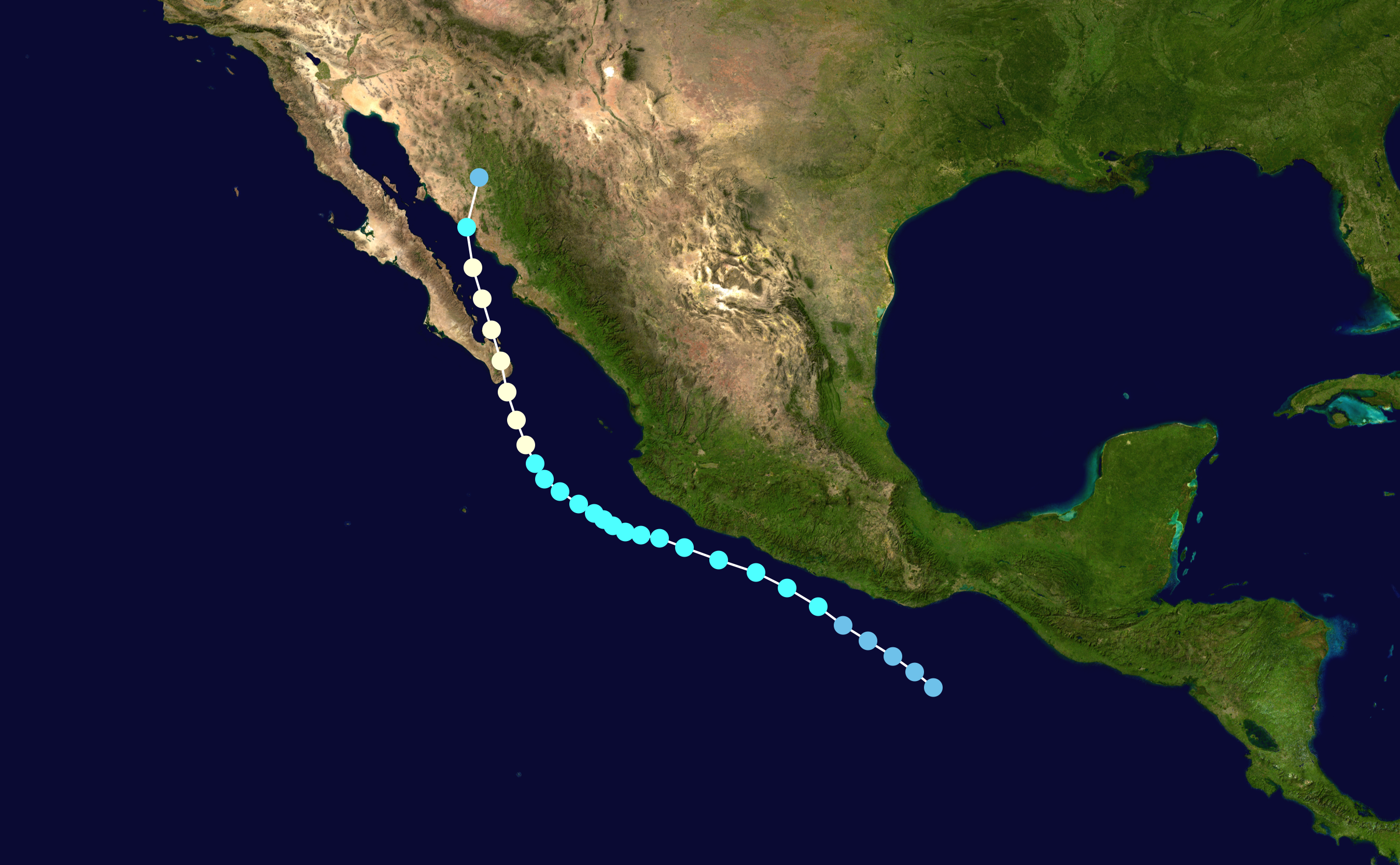
- Duration: August 30 – September 6
- Peak intensity: 85 mph (140 km/h) (1-min); 972 mbar (hPa)

A poorly organized tropical wave moved into the eastern Pacific on August 29 and quickly developed into a tropical depression by 0600 UTC the following day. Within an environment of low wind shear, the depression intensified into a tropical storm, acquiring the name Henriette, at 1200 UTC on August 31. Moving west-northwest around a ridge positioned over inland Mexico, the center passed narrowly offshore after producing squally weather along the coastline. The system moved westward while continuing to intensify, becoming a Category 1 hurricane at 0600 UTC on September 4 and subsequently attaining its peak intensity with winds of 85 mph (137 km/h) and a minimum barometric pressure of 972 mbar (972 hPa; 28.7 inHg) six hours later. An approaching upper-level trough caused Henriette to turn northwest later that day, moving it ashore near San José del Cabo, Mexico at 2100 UTC as a minimal hurricane. After crossing Baja California Sur, Henriette weakened to a tropical storm and made a second landfall near Guaymas, Mexico. The system moved inland and quickly weakened, dissipating by 1200 UTC on September 6.

The hardest hit city by Henriette was Acapulco, where heavy rains led to rockslides and mudslides that killed six. In Sonora, the hurricane damaged thousands of structures and killed four, two of whom off the coast. Farther northwest, a woman died while attempting to surf waves off the coast of Baja California Sur. Heavy rains stranded many cars while causing rivers to overflow, flooding communities. Damage totaled to $275 million (2007 MXN; $25 million).

=== Hurricane Ivo ===
- Category 1 hurricane (SSHWS)
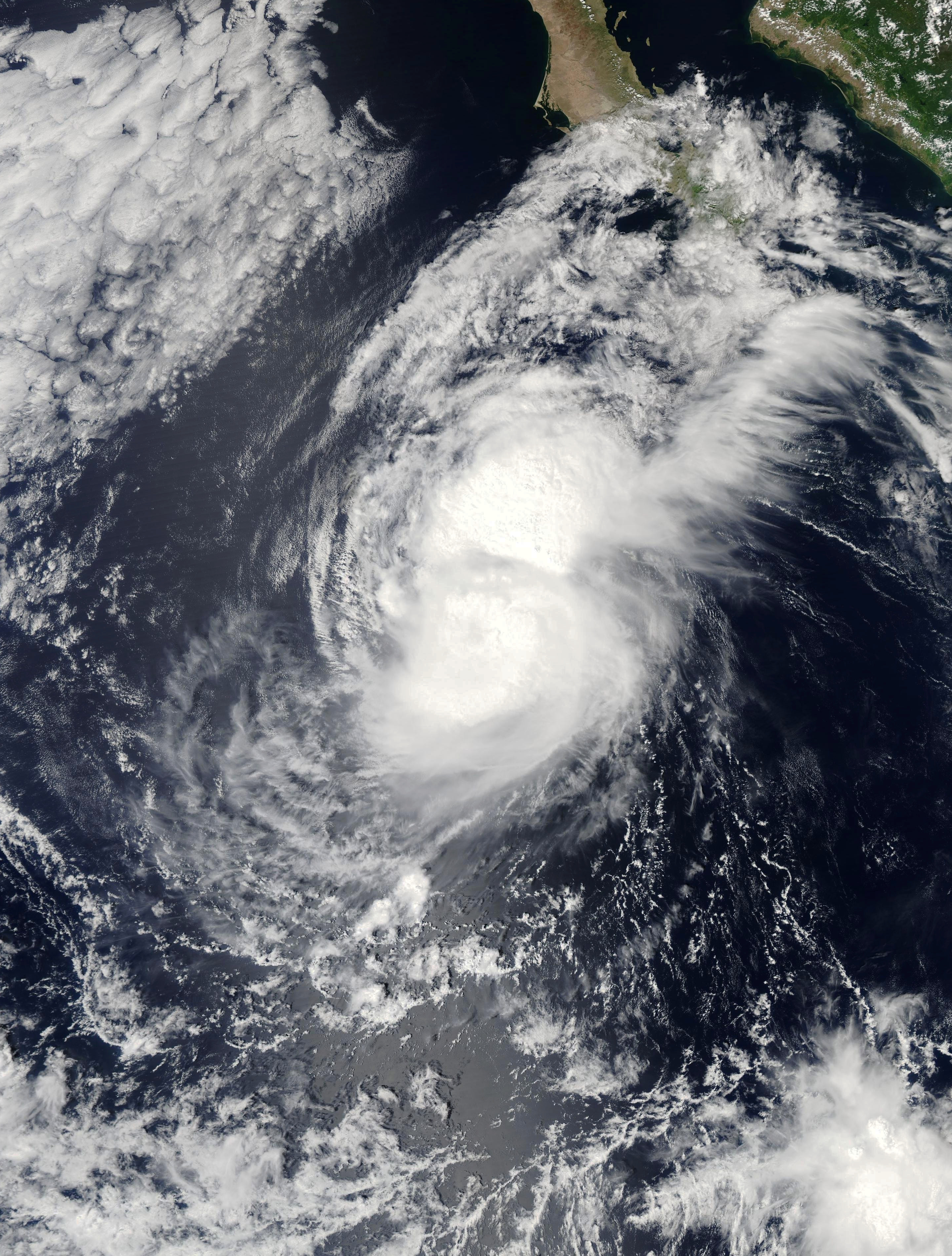
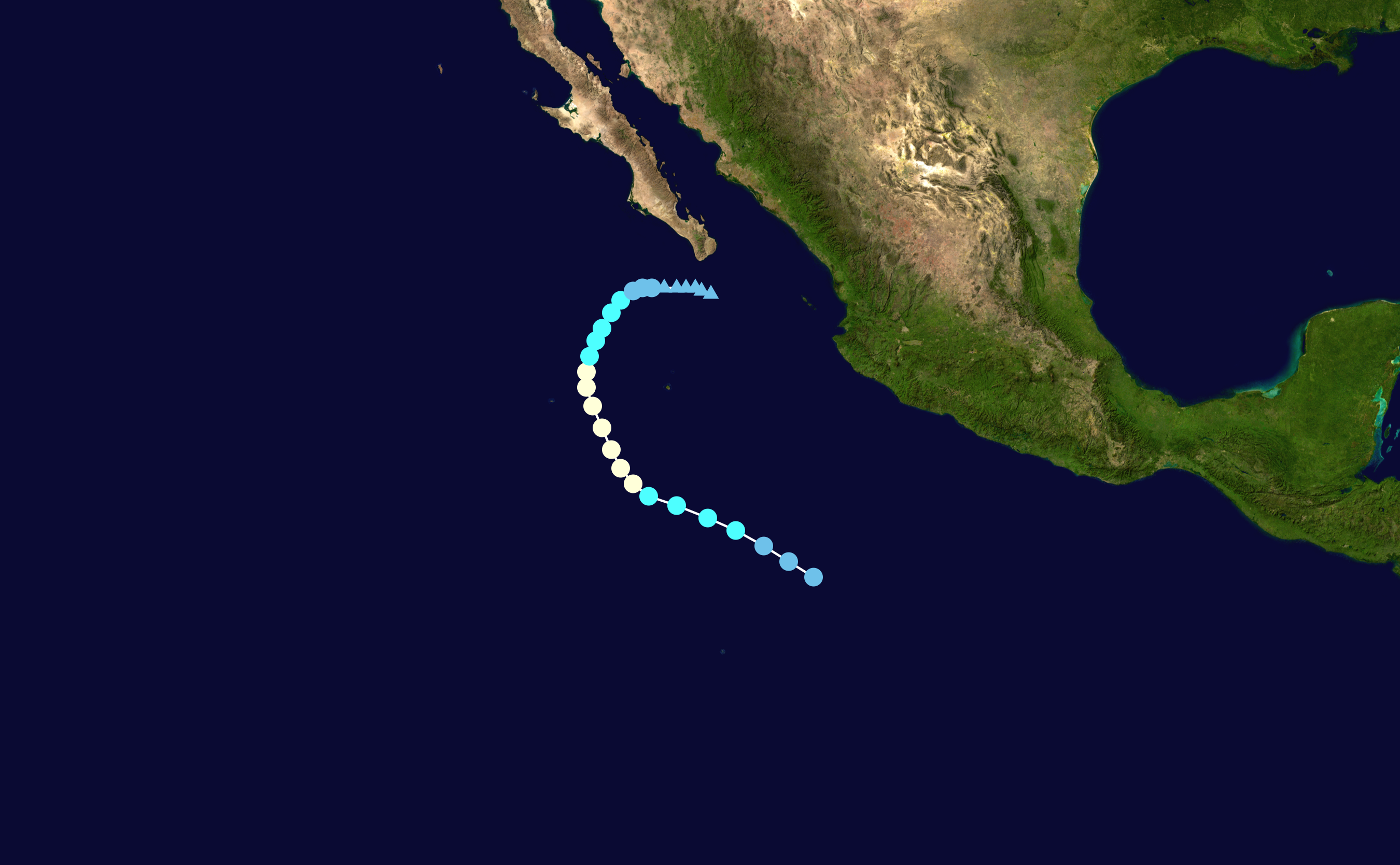
- Duration: September 18 – September 23
- Peak intensity: 80 mph (130 km/h) (1-min); 984 mbar (hPa)

A tropical wave moved off the western coast of Africa on September 1 and continued westward until reaching the eastern Pacific fifteen days later. A broad area of low pressure formed along the wave axis on September 16 as convective activity organized, and by 0600 UTC on September 18, the system acquired enough organization to be declared a tropical depression. Convective bands began to form near the center a few hours later, leading to an improved satellite presentation overall. Tracking west-northwestward as a result of the mid-level ridge, the system intensified into Tropical Storm Ivo at 0000 UTC on September 19. Turning northwest, a well-defined eye became visible on satellite, prompting the NHC to upgrade the system to a Category 1 hurricane 24 hours later. With an area of deep convection near the center, the hurricane attained its peak intensity with winds of 80 mph (130 km/h) and a minimum barometric pressure of 984 mbar (984 hPa; 29.1 inHg) at 0000 UTC on September 21. Westerly flow associated with a large upper-level low began to undercut the outflow of Ivo, and it weakened to a tropical storm by the afternoon hours. The convective pattern rapidly deteriorated due to southeasterly wind shear, and despite a brief burst of convection, the storm was downgraded to a tropical depression to the west-southwest of the southern tip of Baja California at 0000 UTC on September 23. Associated deep convection dissipated later that day as Ivo turned eastward, and the system degenerated into a remnant low accordingly. The remnant low dissipated two days later as it continued in the same direction.

Initially, some forecasts predicted the storm would strike the Baja California Peninsula as a tropical storm; a tropical storm watch was briefly issued from Santa Fe to Cabo San Lucas accordingly. Over 100 shelters were opened in the municipalities of Los Cabos, La Paz and Comondú, respectively. In all, Ivo contributed to heavy rainfall across Baja California Sur; however, no damage was reported.

=== Tropical Depression Thirteen-E ===
- Tropical depression (SSHWS)
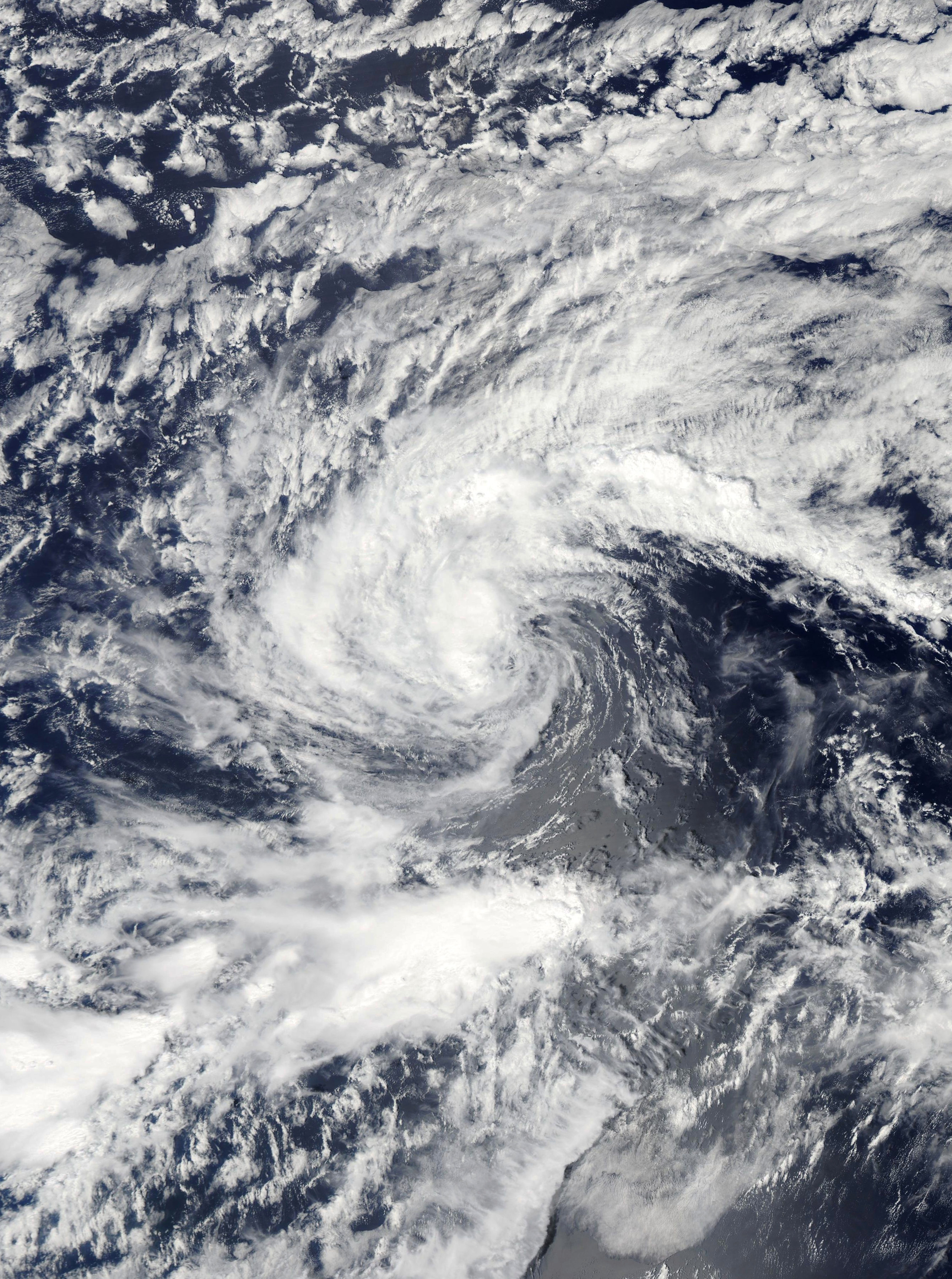
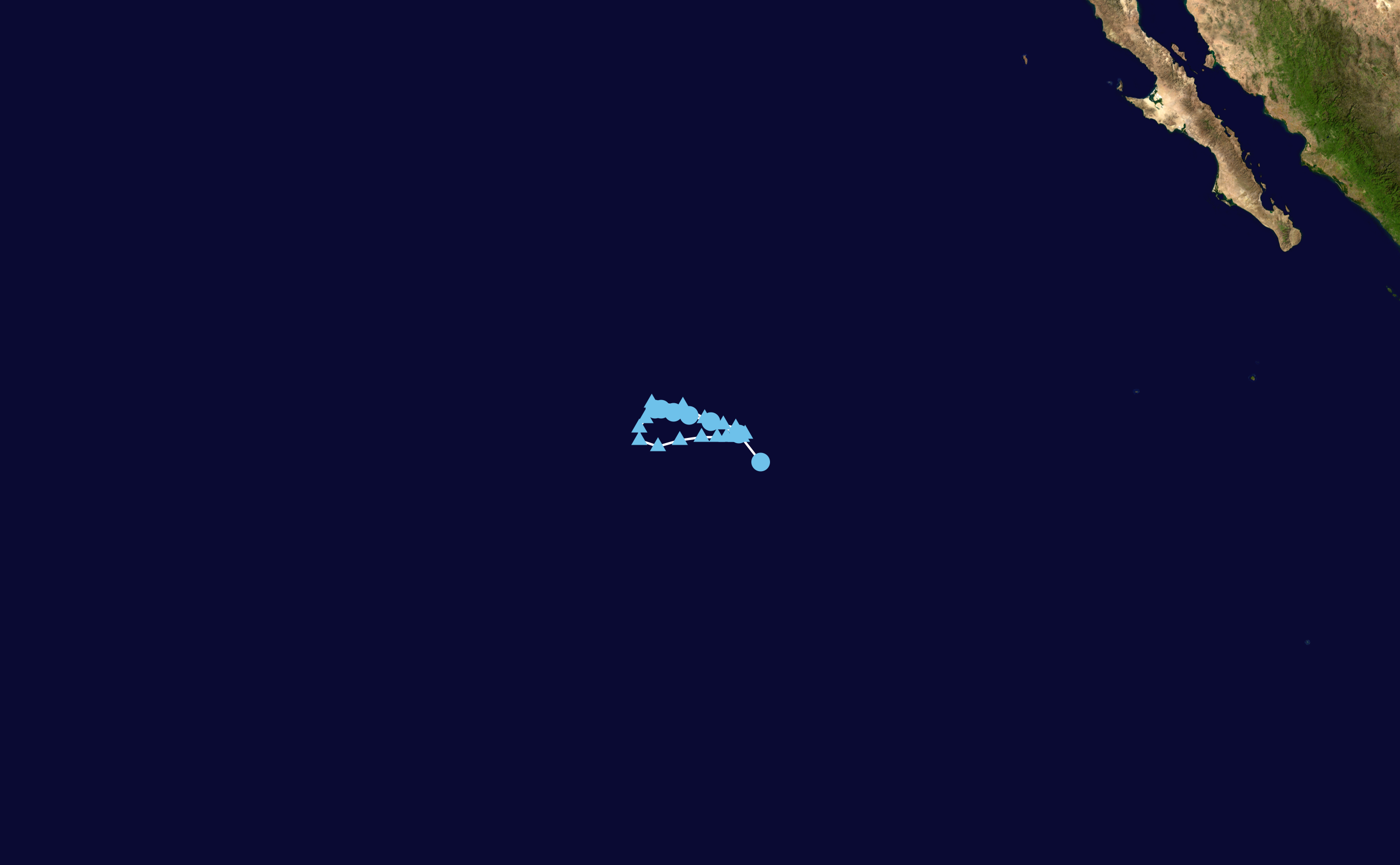
- Duration: September 19 – September 20
- Peak intensity: 35 mph (55 km/h) (1-min); 1007 mbar (hPa)

A tropical wave emerged off the western coast of Africa on August 27 and reached the eastern Pacific on September 7. Tracking westward, little development occurred until September 18, when associated shower and thunderstorm activity began to increase. Following visible satellite trends, the National Hurricane Center deemed the disturbance organized enough to be declared a tropical depression at 0600 UTC on September 19, while located about 1,200 mi (1,900 km) west-southwest of the southern tip of Baja California. In an environment of cool ocean temperatures and stable air, the depression failed to organize as it turned west-northwest. Associated deep convection dissipated, leading to degeneration into a remnant low by 0000 UTC on September 20. Performing a slow counter-clockwise loop, the remnant low dissipated five days later.

=== Tropical Storm Juliette ===
- Tropical storm (SSHWS)
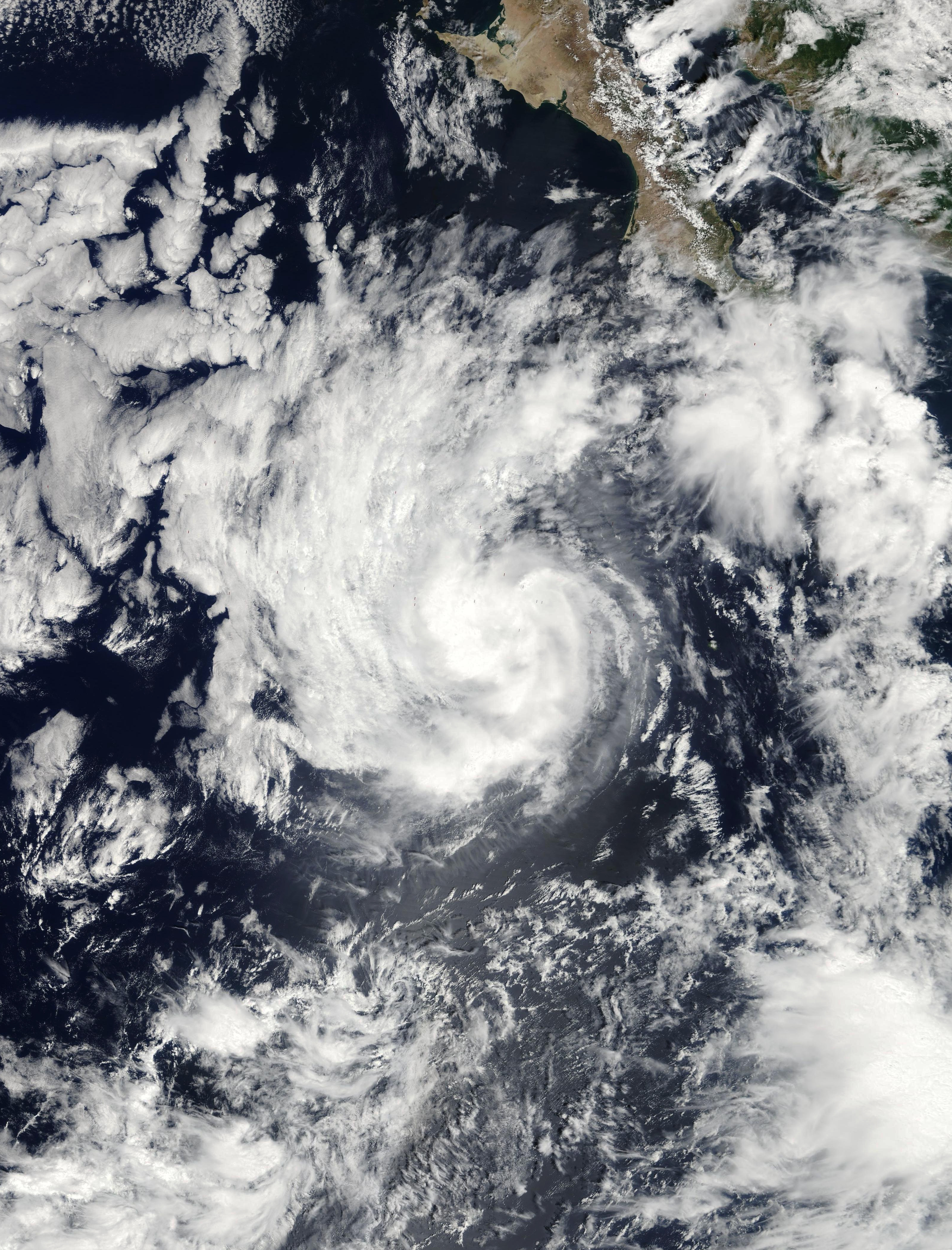
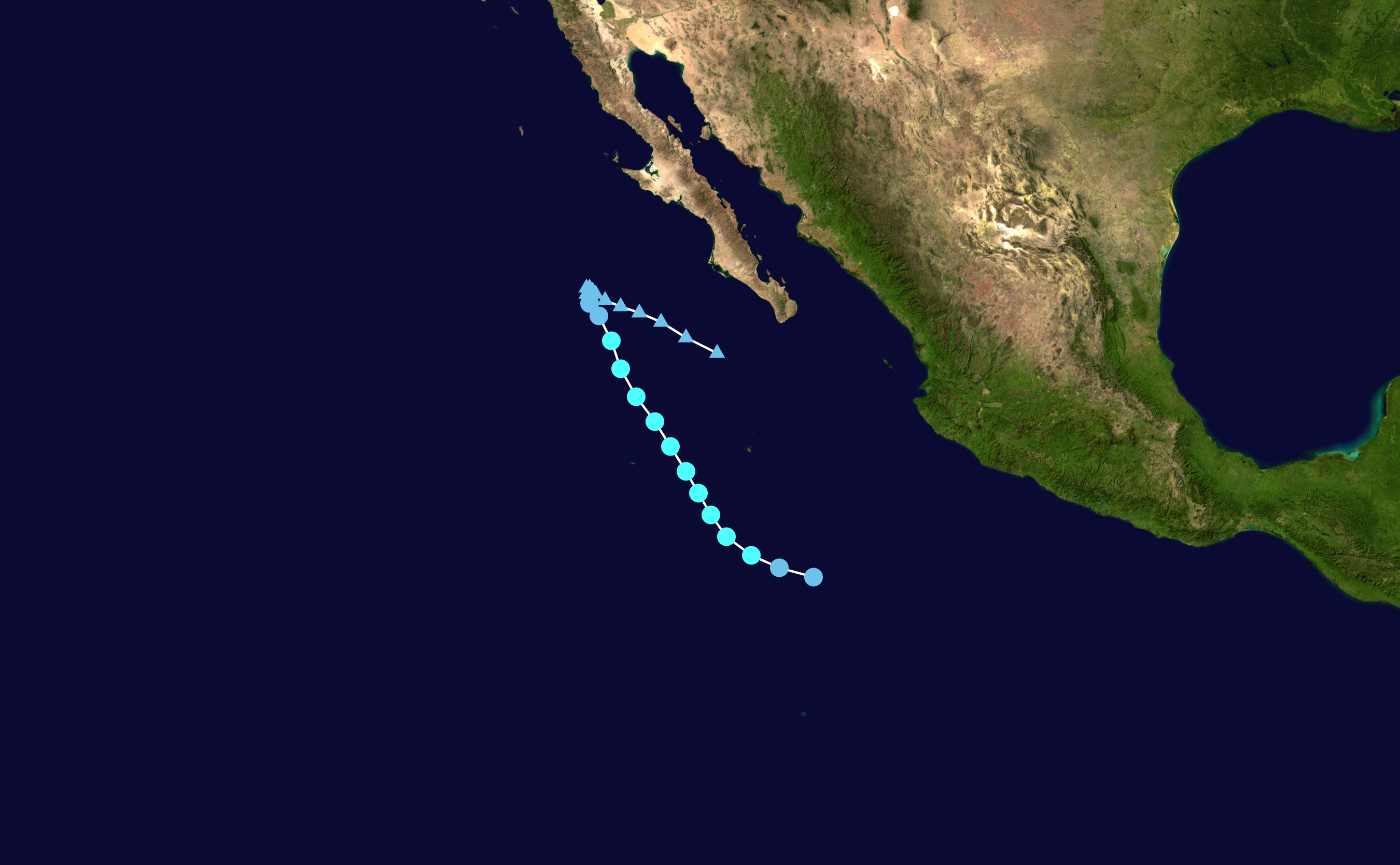
- Duration: September 29 – October 2
- Peak intensity: 60 mph (95 km/h) (1-min); 997 mbar (hPa)

The formation of Tropical Storm Juliette can be traced back to a tropical wave that emerged off the western coast of Africa on September 12. After interacting with a secondary wave over the central Atlantic a few days later, it entered the eastern Caribbean, becoming steadily better defined. Convective activity was enhanced as the wave passed into the West Caribbean on September 22 and it moved inland over Central American shortly thereafter. A broad area of low pressure formed along the wave axis on September 27 and convection steadily increased; around 0000 UTC on September 29, the system acquired enough organization to be declared a tropical depression. Twelve hours later, the system intensified into Tropical Storm Juliette. Turning northwest as a result of an upper-level trough, the system attained its peak with winds of 60 mph (97 km/h) and a minimum barometric pressure of 997 mbar (997 hPa; 29.4 inHg) at 1200 UTC on September 30. Strong wind shear began to affect the storm thereafter, causing it to steadily weaken to tropical depression strength by 0000 UTC on October 2. Twelve hours later, the system degenerated into a remnant low. The low meandered several hundred miles off the coast of Baja California before degenerating into a trough on October 5.

=== Tropical Storm Kiko ===
- Tropical storm (SSHWS)
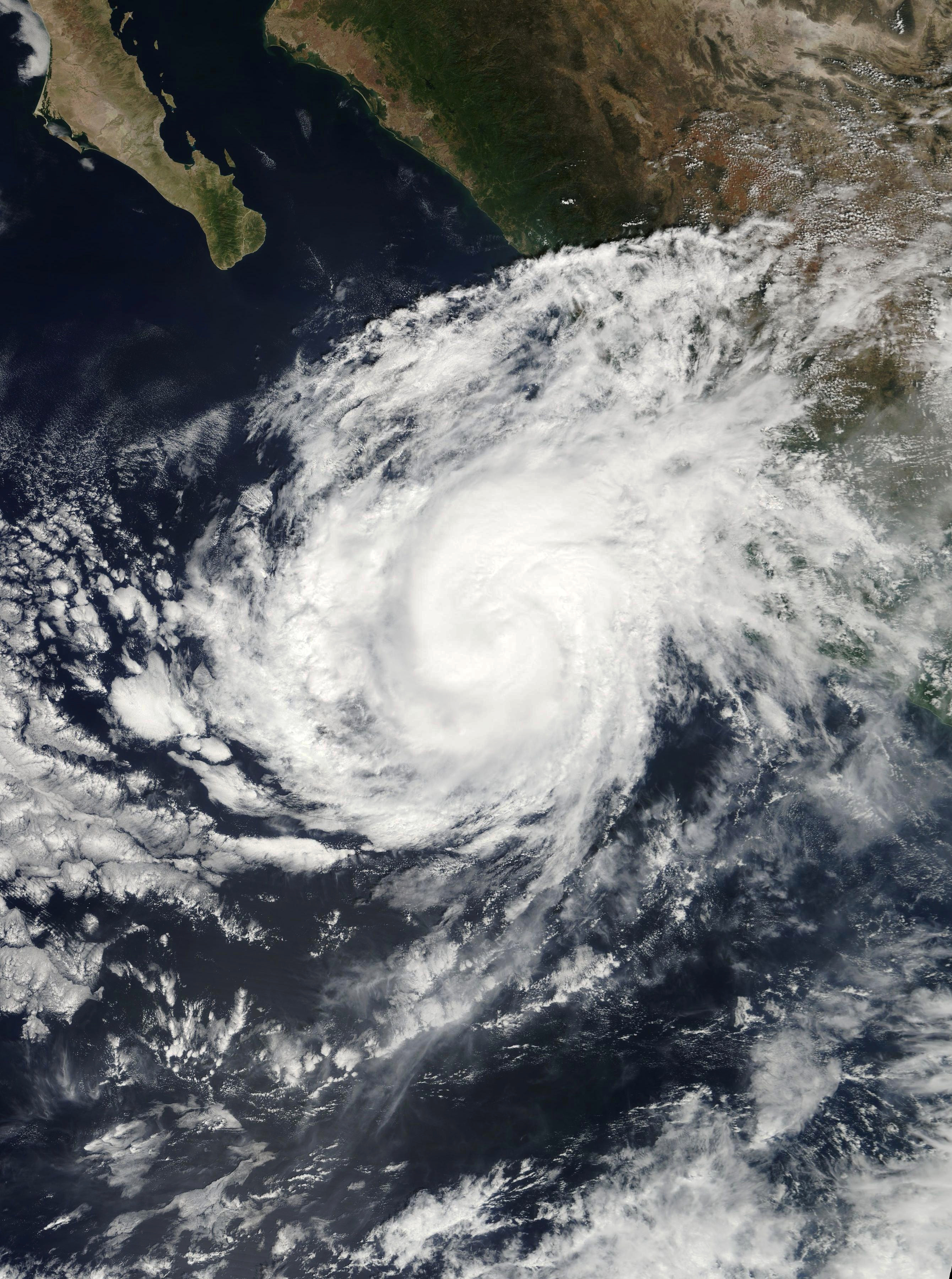
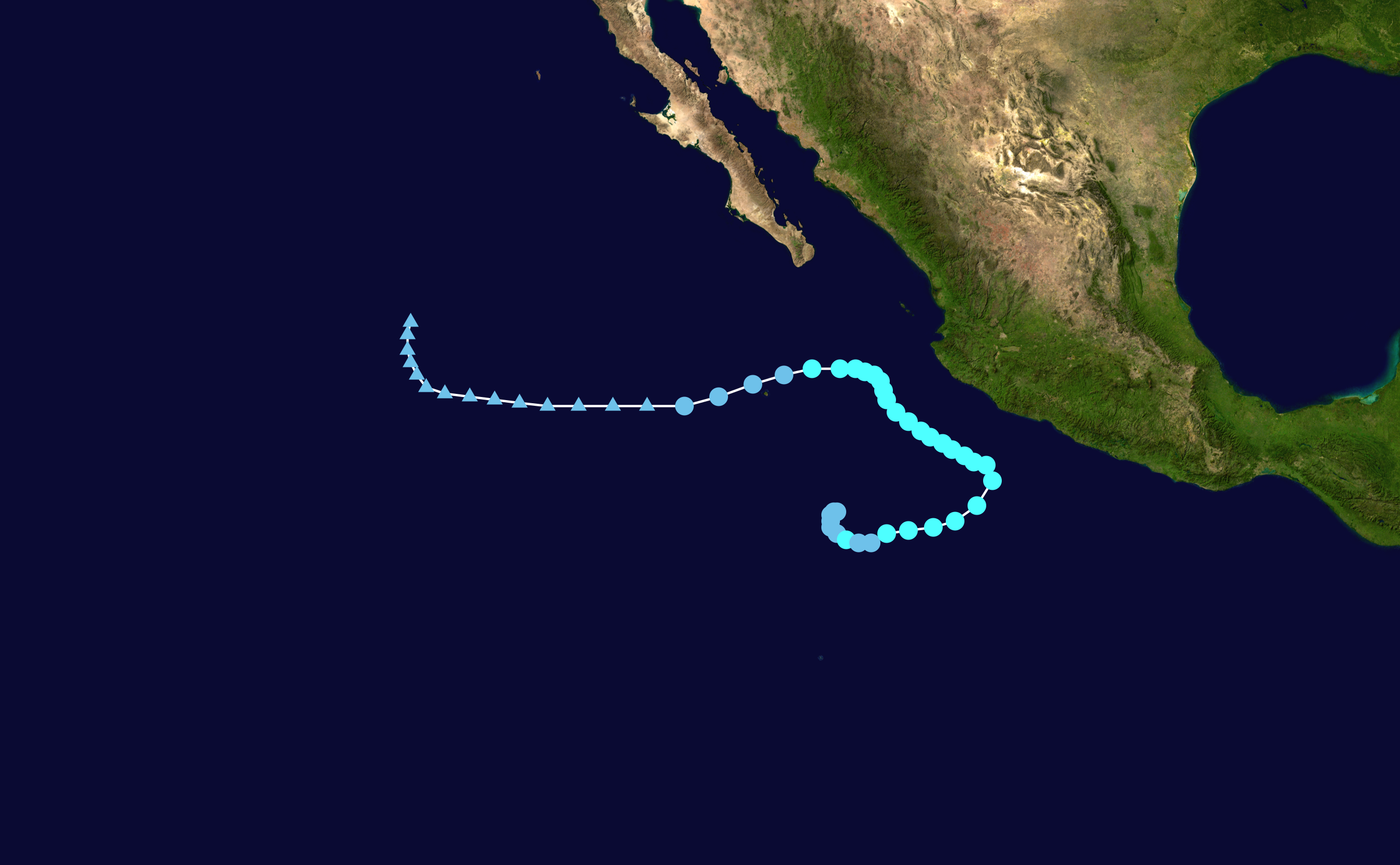
- Duration: October 15 – October 23
- Peak intensity: 70 mph (110 km/h) (1-min); 991 mbar (hPa)

A tropical wave exited the coast of Africa and moved westward across the Atlantic before entering the eastern Pacific on October 8. Despite strong easterly wind shear, the system acquired enough organization to be deemed a tropical depression at 0000 UTC on October 15. Within a broad cyclonic gyre, the system moved erratically, first drifting south then east-northeast and eventually northwest. Early on October 16, the system briefly intensified into a tropical storm as a convective band wrapped around the circulation, but continued strong shear caused associated convection to dissipate and the system weakened to a tropical depression by 1800 UTC. After intensifying back to a tropical storm the following day, a brief reprieve in harsh upper-level winds allowed Kiko to reach its peak intensity with winds of 70 mph (110 km/h) and a minimum barometric pressure of 991 mbar (991 hPa; 29.3 inHg). An increase in southerly shear and entrance into a more stable airmass caused the system to weaken to a tropical depression at 0000 UTC on October 23; the system degenerated into a remnant low 24 hours later. The remnant low tracked west before turning north and eventually dissipated early on October 27.

Beginning early on October 18, Kiko was forecast to strike Mexico at tropical storm intensity and cyclone advisories were issued accordingly. However, a building mid-level ridge of high pressure over inland Mexico was then forecast to cause the center of circulation to pass just offshore. Though no damage was reported in association with the cyclone, rough seas created by Kiko capsized a ship with thirty people on board; two were found still alive, fifteen bodies were recovered, and nine were reported missing. Kiko's remnants caused severe flash floods in California, damage totaling to $1.08 million.

== Storm names ==
The following list of names was used for named storms that formed in the eastern North Pacific, east of 140°W, in 2007. This is the same list used in 2001 with the exception of Alvin, which replaced Adolph. The name Alvin was used for the first time this year. There were no names retired from this list following the season, thus it was used again for the 2013 season.

- Alvin
- Barbara
- Cosme *
- Dalila
- Erick
- Flossie *
- Gil
- Henriette
- Ivo
- Juliette
- Kiko
- Lorena (unused)
- Manuel (unused)
- Narda (unused)
- Octave (unused)
- Priscilla (unused)
- Raymond (unused)
- Sonia (unused)
- Tico (unused)
- Velma (unused)
- Wallis (unused)
- Xina (unused)
- York (unused)
- Zelda (unused)

For named storms that form in the central North Pacific, between 140°W and the International Date Line, the names come from a series of four rotating lists. Names are used one after the other without regard to year, and when the bottom of one list is reached, the next named storm receives the name at the top of the next list. No named storms formed in the region in 2007. Named storms in the table above that crossed into the area during the season are noted (*).

== Season effects ==
The following table lists all of the storms that formed in the 2007 Pacific hurricane season. It includes their name, duration, peak classification and intensities, areas affected, damage, and death totals. Deaths in parentheses are additional and indirect (an example of an indirect death would be a traffic accident), but were still related to that storm. Damage and deaths include totals while the storm was extratropical, a wave, or a low, and all of the damage figures are in 2007 USD.

Saffir–Simpson scale
TD	TS	C1	C2	C3	C4	C5

2007 Pacific hurricane season statistics
Storm name	Dates active	Storm category at peak intensity	Max 1-min wind mph (km/h)	Min. press. (mbar)	Areas affected	Damage (US$)	Deaths	Ref(s).
Alvin	May 27–31	Tropical storm	40 (65)	1003	None	None	None	
Barbara	May 29 – June 2	Tropical storm	50 (85)	1000	Southwestern Mexico	$55 million	4	
Three-E	June 11–12	Tropical depression	35 (55)	1004	None	None	None	
Four-E	July 9–11	Tropical depression	35 (55)	1006	None	None	None	
Five-E	July 14–15	Tropical depression	35 (55)	1006	None	None	None	
Cosme	July 14–22	Category 1 hurricane	75 (120)	987	Hawaii	Minimal	None	
Dalila	July 22–27	Tropical storm	60 (95)	995	Baja California Peninsula, Western Mexico (Jalisco)	Minimal	11	
Erick	July 31 – August 2	Tropical storm	40 (65)	1004	None	None	None	
Flossie	August 8–16	Category 4 hurricane	140 (220)	949	Hawaii	Minimal	None	
Gil	August 29 – September 2	Tropical storm	45 (75)	1001	Western Mexico	Minimal	1	
Henriette	August 30 – September 6	Category 1 hurricane	85 (140)	972	Southwestern Mexico, Western Mexico, Baja California Peninsula, Northwestern Mexico (Sonora)	$25 million	11	
Ivo	September 18–23	Category 1 hurricane	80 (130)	984	Baja California Peninsula	None	None	
Thirteen-E	September 19–20	Tropical depression	35 (55)	1007	None	None	None	
Juliette	September 29 – October 2	Tropical storm	60 (95)	997	None	None	None	
Kiko	October 15–23	Tropical storm	70 (110)	991	Western Mexico	$1.08 million	15	
Season aggregates
15 systems	May 27 – October 23		140 (220)	949		$80 million	42	

== See also ==
- Tropical cyclones in 2007
- Pacific hurricane season
- 2007 Atlantic hurricane season
- 2007 Pacific typhoon season
- 2007 North Indian Ocean cyclone season
- Australian region cyclone seasons: 2006–07, 2007–08
- South Pacific cyclone seasons: 2006–07, 2007–08
- South-West Indian Ocean cyclone seasons: 2006–07, 2007–08
