= Las Quintas (Culiacán) =

Las Quintas Quintas
- Sector 3 of Culiacán
- Las Quintas
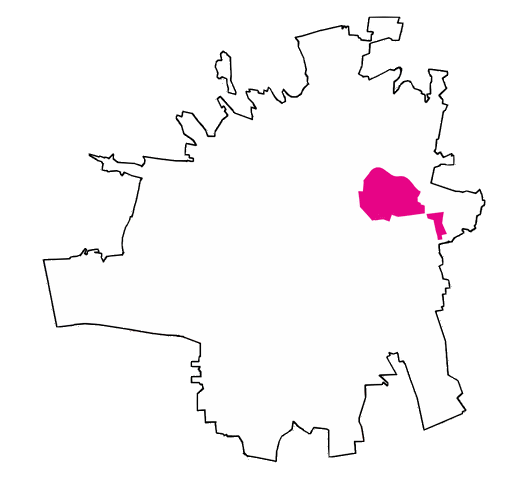
- Location of Las Quintas
- Coordinates: 24°49′30″N 107°22′54″W
- Country: Mexico
- State: Sinaloa
- Municipality: Culiacán Municipality
- City: Culiacán
- Colonias of downtown: List: Las Quintas; Miguel Hidalgo; La Campiña; Genaro Estrada; Villa del Real; Las Vegas; Aurora; Vicente Guerrero; Camino Real; Periodista; Residencial Viñedos; Residencial Amapas; Residencial Quinta Americana; Riberas de Tamazula
- ZIP codes: 80040, 80060, 80063, 80070, 80080, 80090, 80247, 80308
- Website: culiacan.gob.mx

Las Quintas is a colonia of Culiacán, Sinaloa.
