= 1956 Pacific hurricane season =

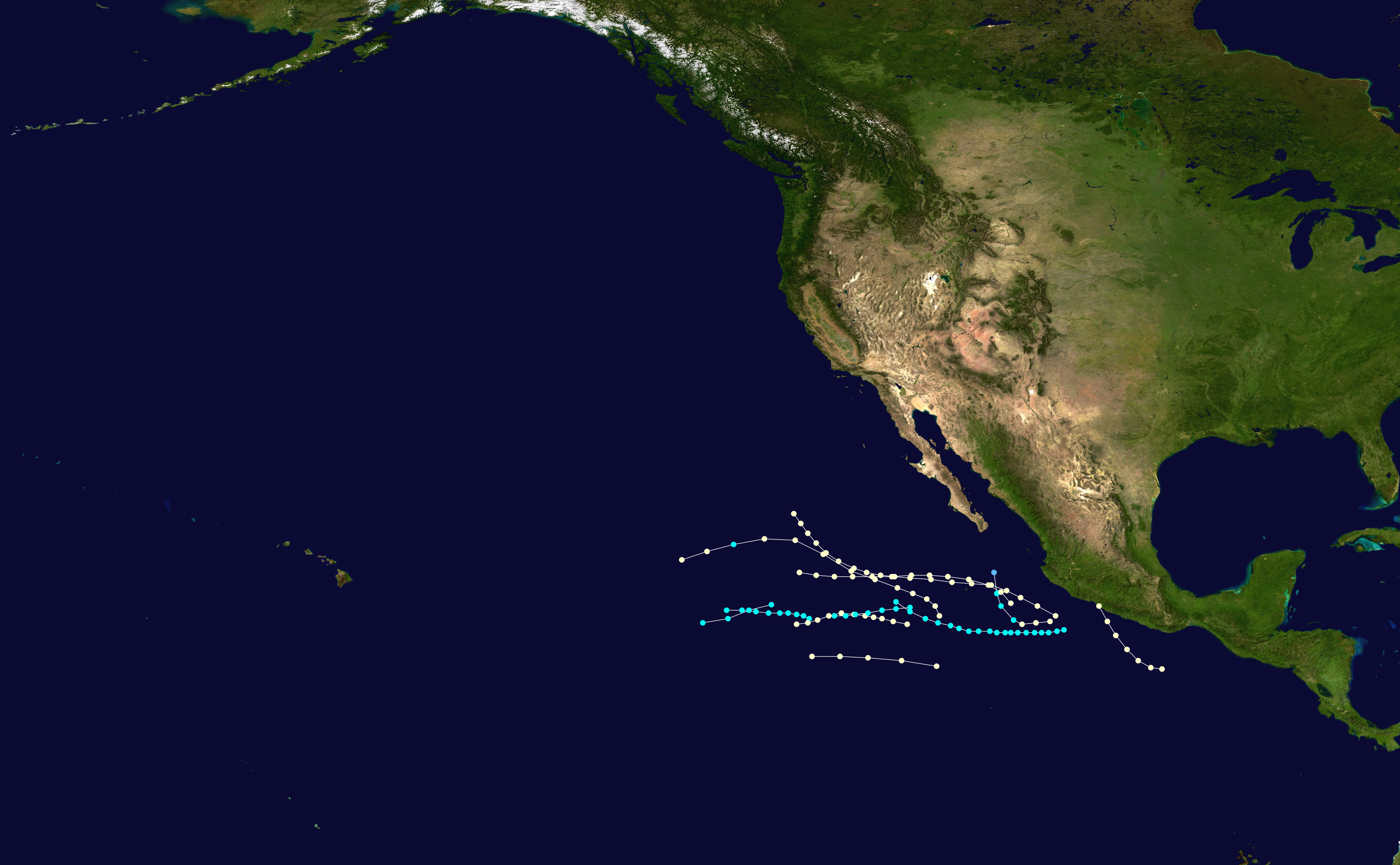
- Season summary map

Seasonal boundaries
- First system formed: May 18, 1956
- Last system dissipated: October 18, 1956

Strongest storm
- Name: Hurricane One
  - Maximum winds: 85 mph (140 km/h) (1-minute sustained)
  - Lowest pressure: 979 mbar (hPa; 28.91 inHg)

Seasonal statistics
- Total storms: 11
- Hurricanes: 7
- Major hurricanes (Cat. 3+): 0
- Total fatalities: 0
- Total damage: None

Related articles
- 1956 Atlantic hurricane season; 1956 Pacific typhoon season; 1950s North Indian Ocean cyclone seasons

The 1956 Pacific hurricane season ran through the summer and fall of 1956. Eleven tropical systems were observed this season.

== Systems ==
=== Hurricane One ===
- Category 1 hurricane (SSHWS)
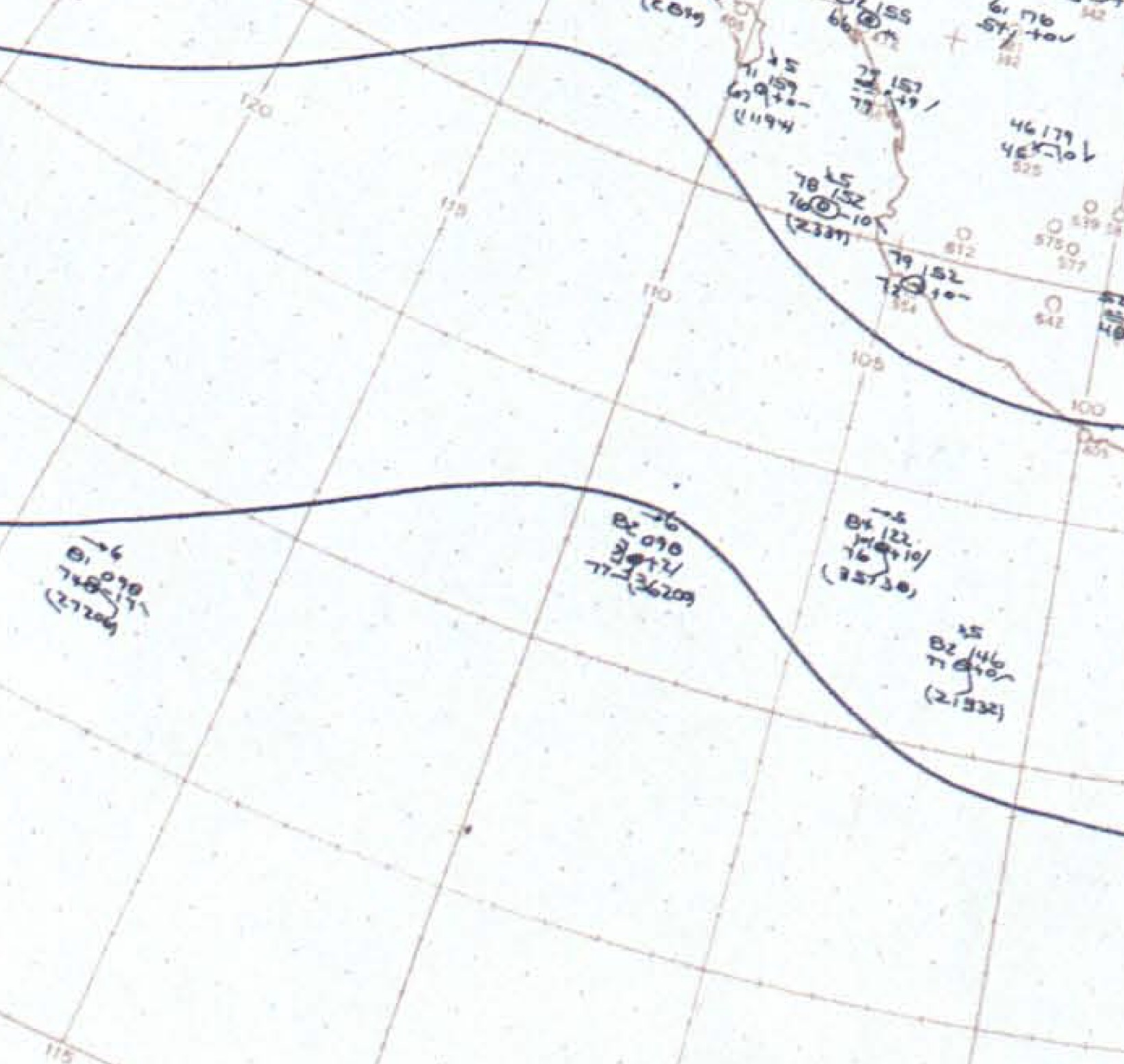
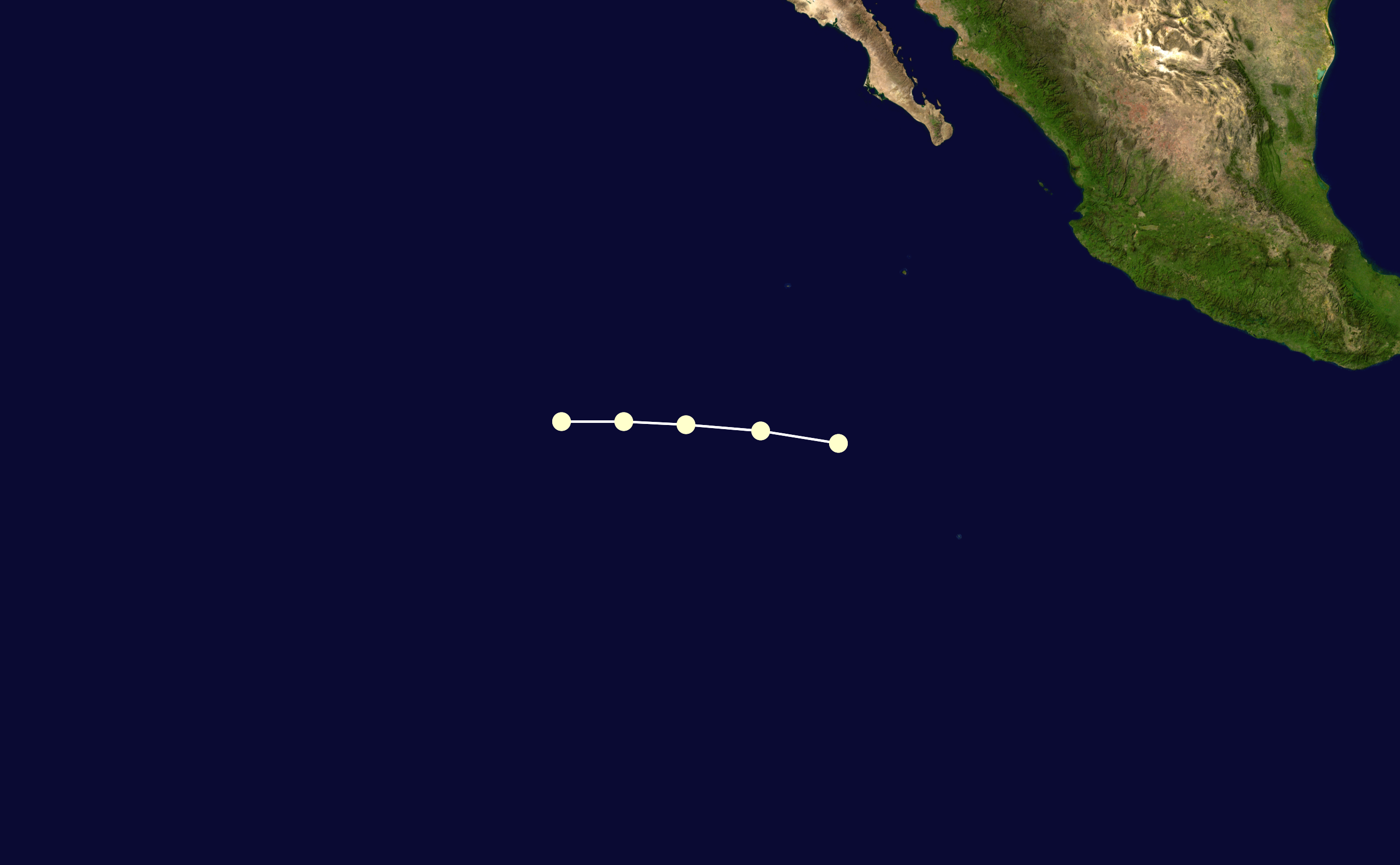
- Duration: May 18 – May 19
- Peak intensity: 85 mph (140 km/h) (1-min); 979 mbar (hPa)

Hurricane One existed from May 18 to May 19.

=== Tropical Storm Two ===
- Tropical storm (SSHWS)
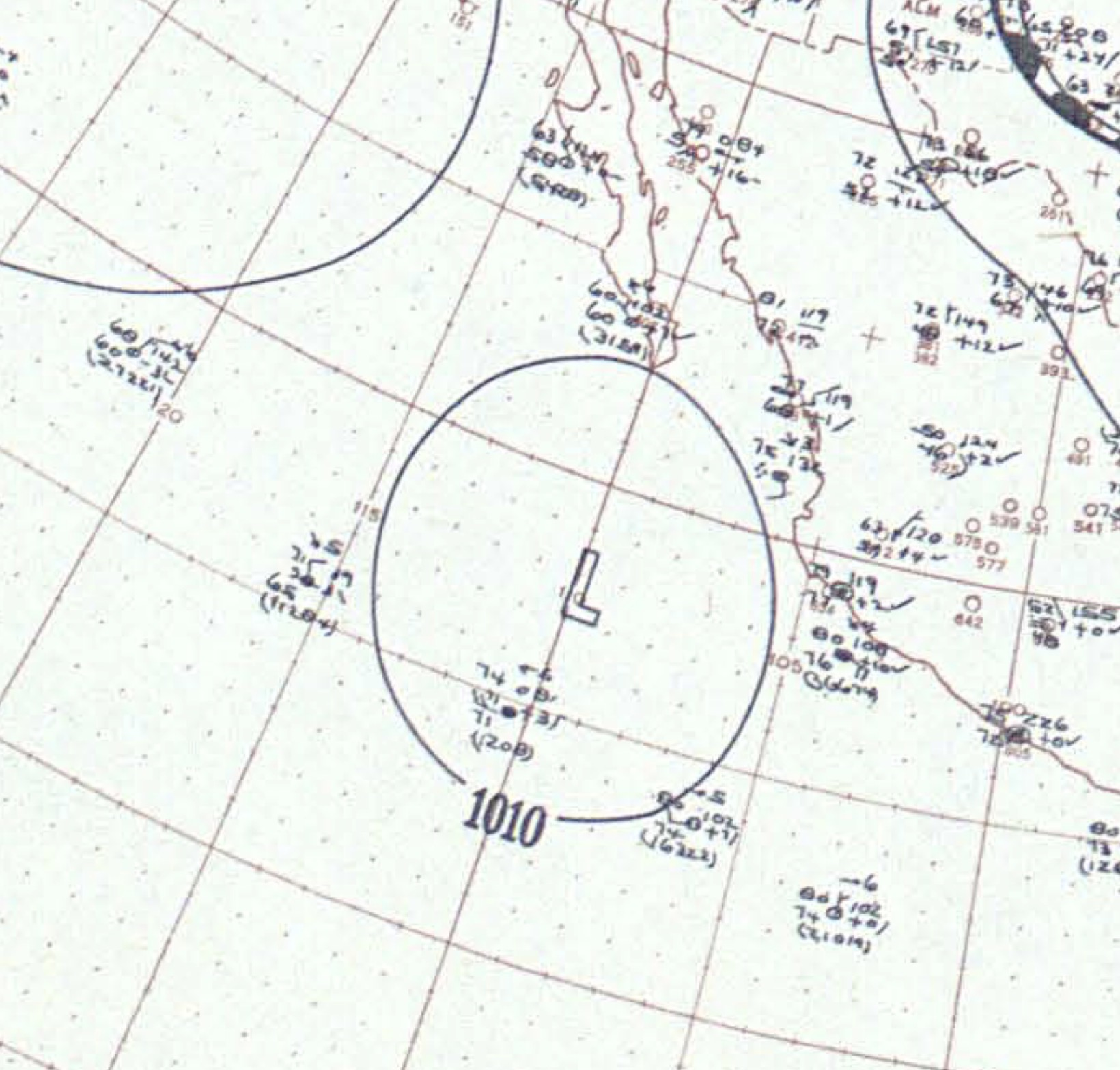
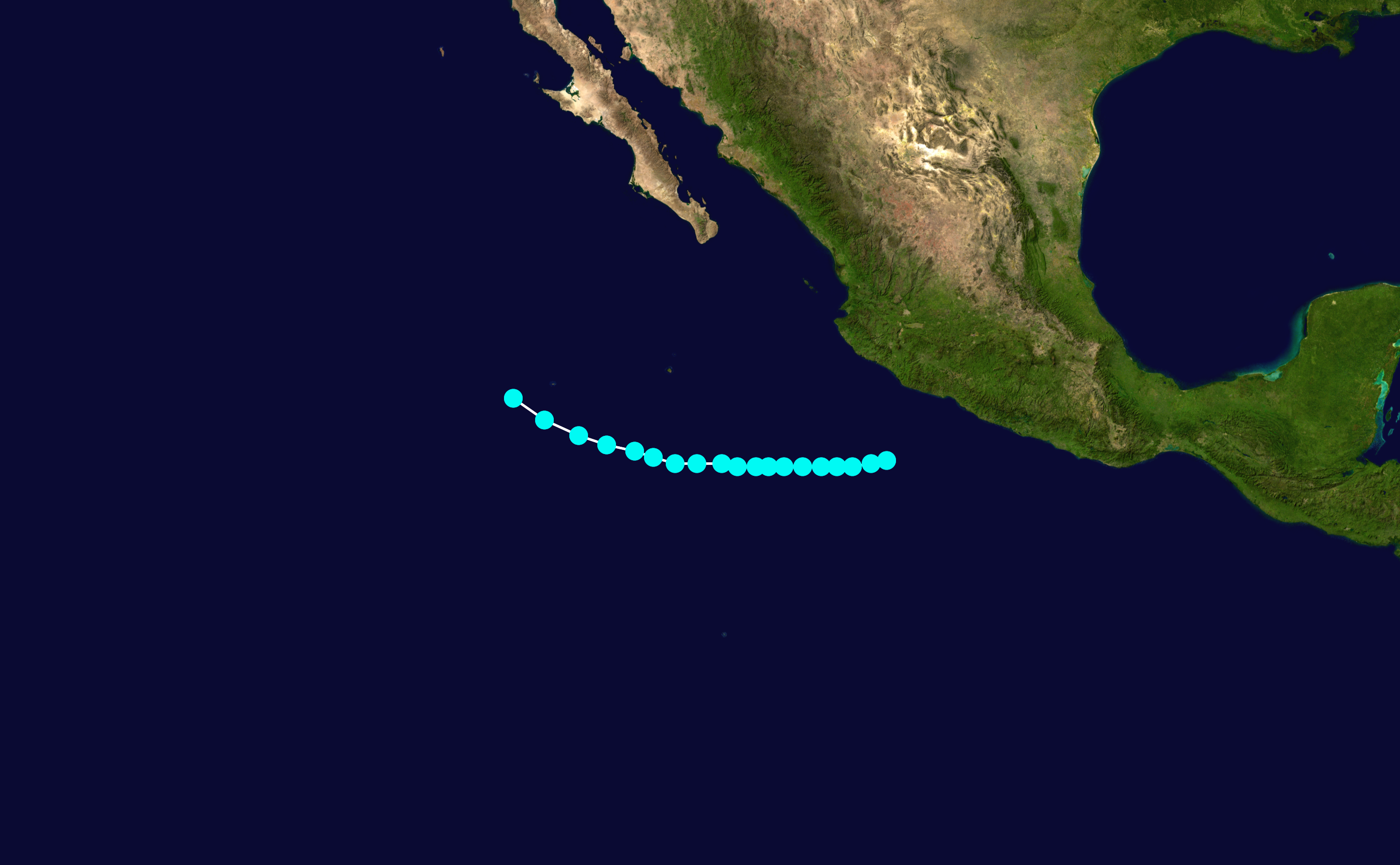
- Duration: May 30 – June 3
- Peak intensity: 50 mph (85 km/h) (1-min); 1000 mbar (hPa)

Tropical Storm Two existed from May 30 to June 3.

=== Hurricane Three ===
- Category 1 hurricane (SSHWS)
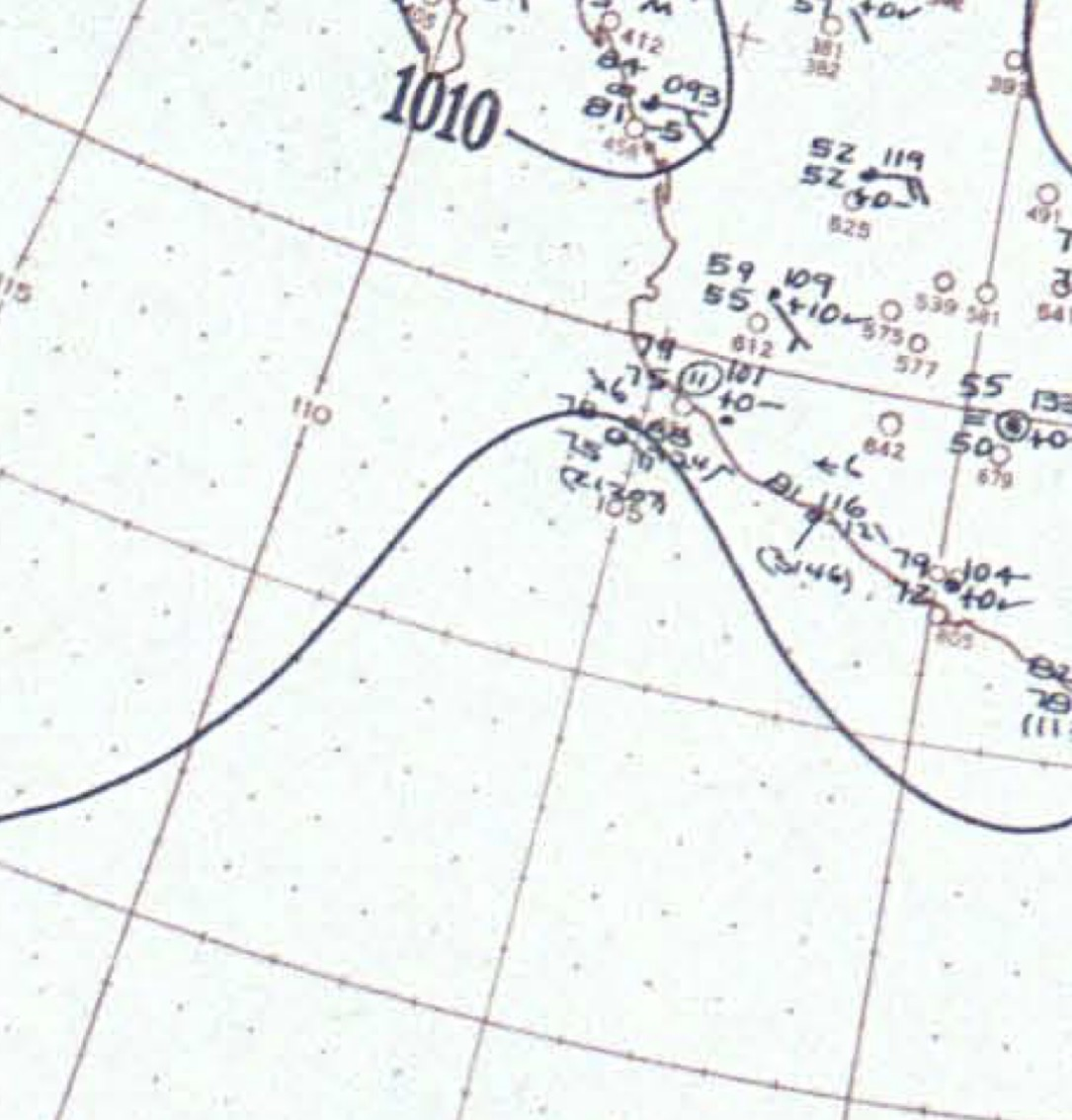
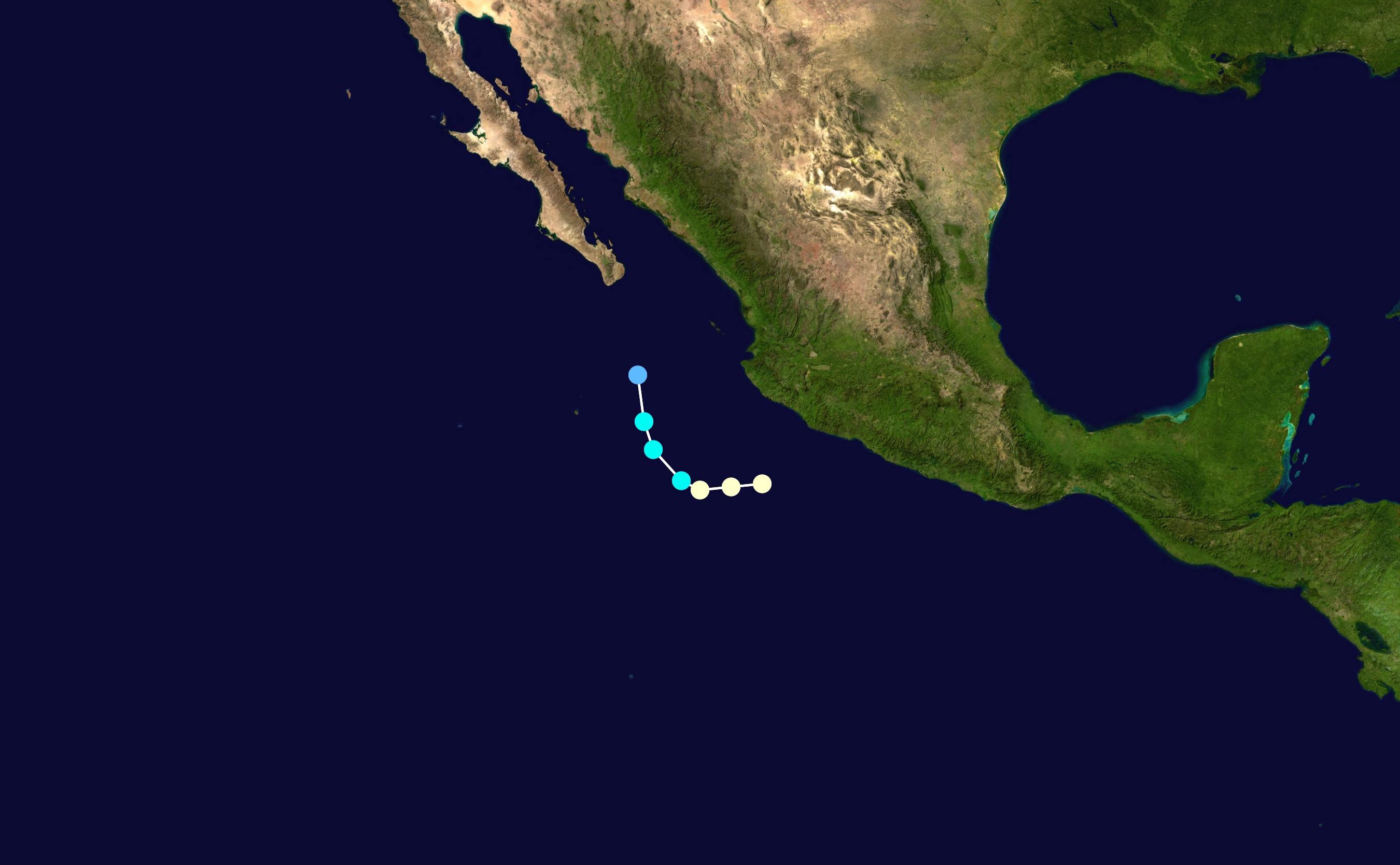
- Duration: June 9 – June 10
- Peak intensity: 85 mph (140 km/h) (1-min); 985 mbar (hPa)

Hurricane Three existed from June 9 to June 10.

=== Hurricane Four ===
- Category 1 hurricane (SSHWS)
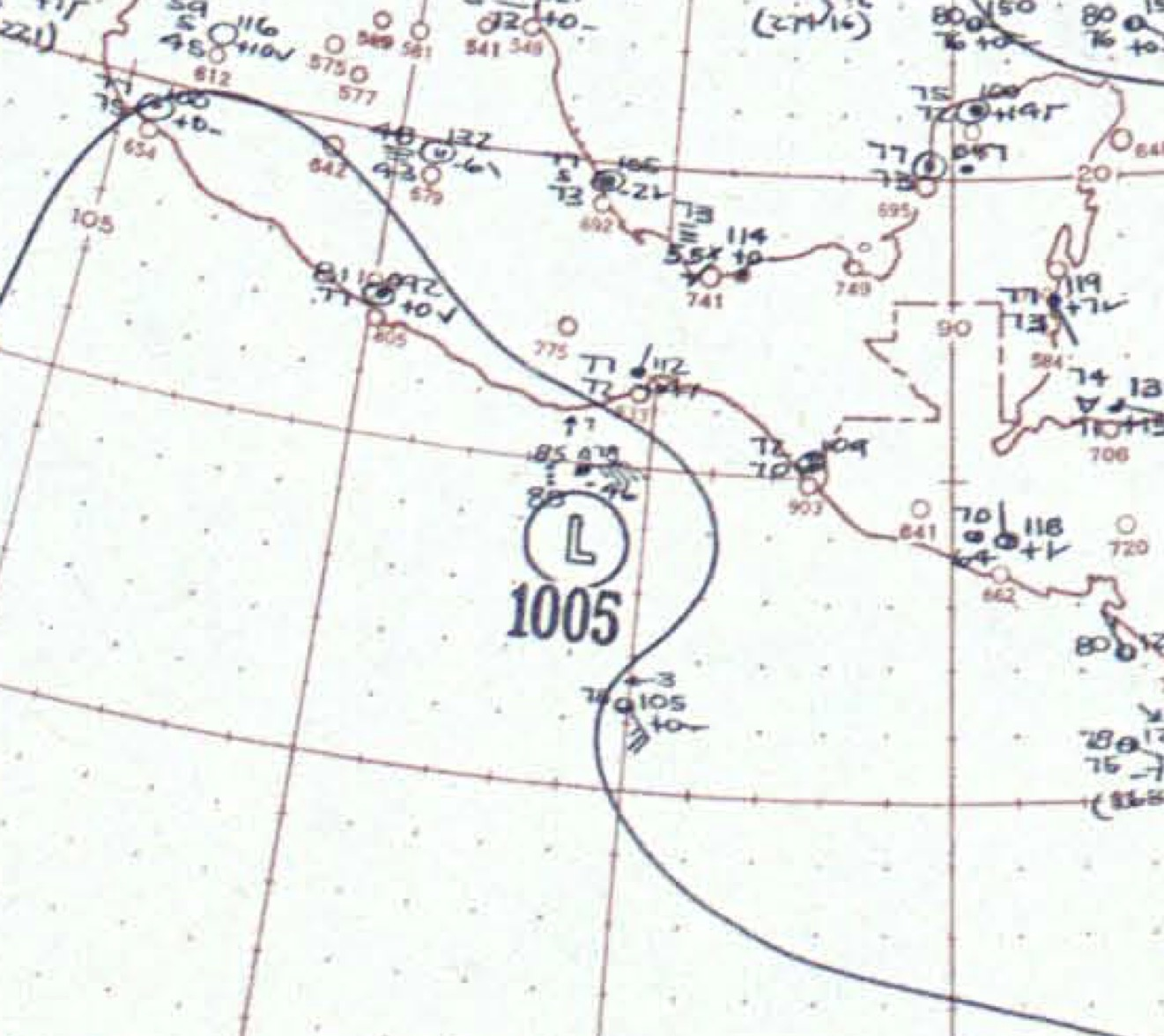
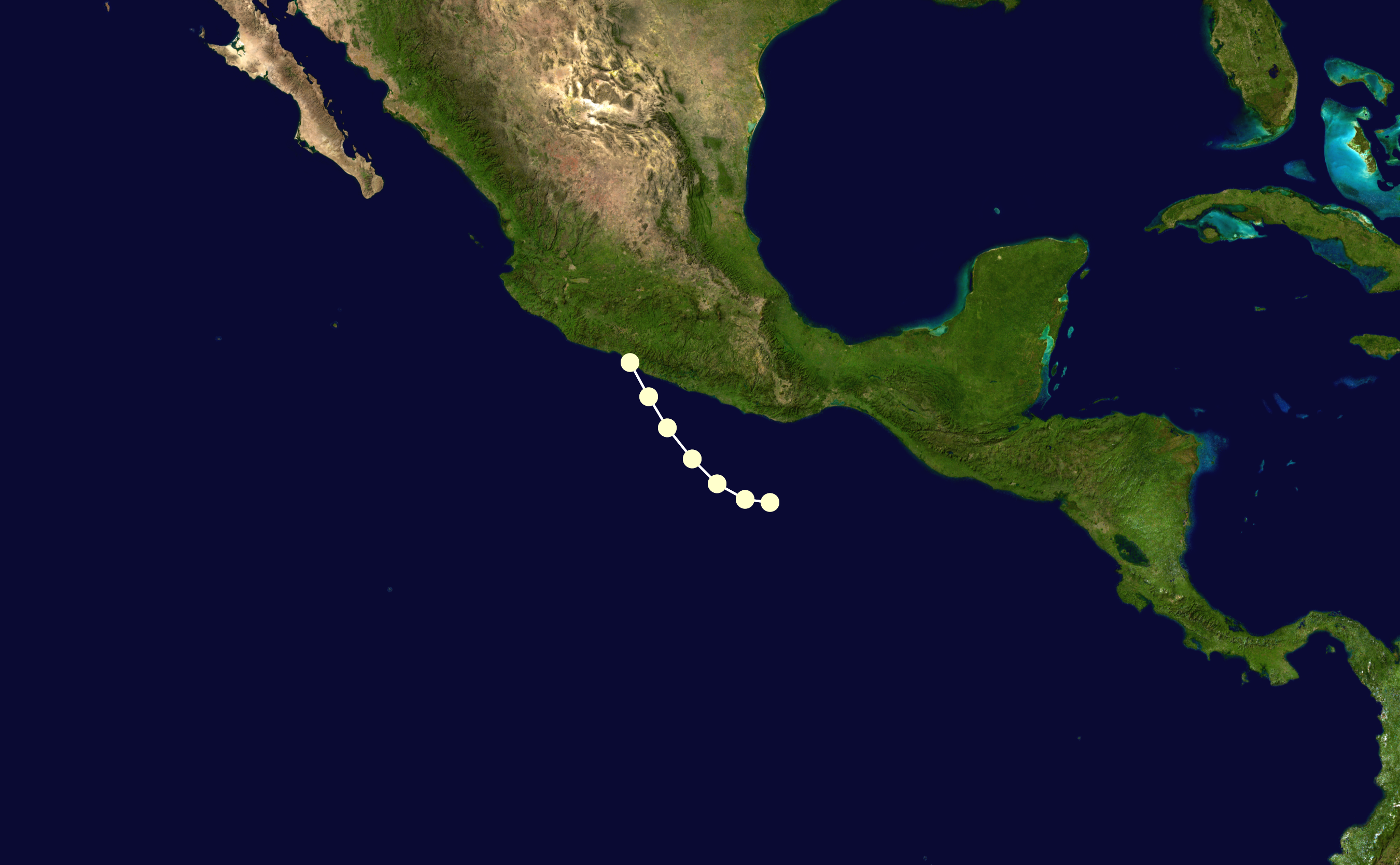
- Duration: June 12 – June 14
- Peak intensity: 85 mph (140 km/h) (1-min); 984 mbar (hPa)

On June 11, a small low pressure system was first identified around 300 mi (480 km) south of the Gulf of Tehuantepec, producing sustained winds which neared 30 mph (50 km/h). By 12:00 UTC the next day, the system intensified into a hurricane with sustained winds of 85 mph (140 km/h), with nearby ship reports indicating that the storm was producing sustained gales. Moving west-northwestward slowly, on June 13, reports from the Portland Star indicated that the hurricane had deepened into a minimum pressure of 29.06 inHg (984 hPa) and was producing gusts exceeding 115 mph (185 km/h). Never intensifying further than 85 mph (140 km/h), the hurricane tracked north-northwestwards prior to making landfall around 150 mi (240 km) east-southeast of Manzanillo, in the state of Guerrero. Weakening rapidly, the hurricane was last noted on June 14.

The hurricane produced 30 ft (9.1 m) waves and caused heavy rainfall in Mexico.

=== Hurricane Five ===
- Category 1 hurricane (SSHWS)
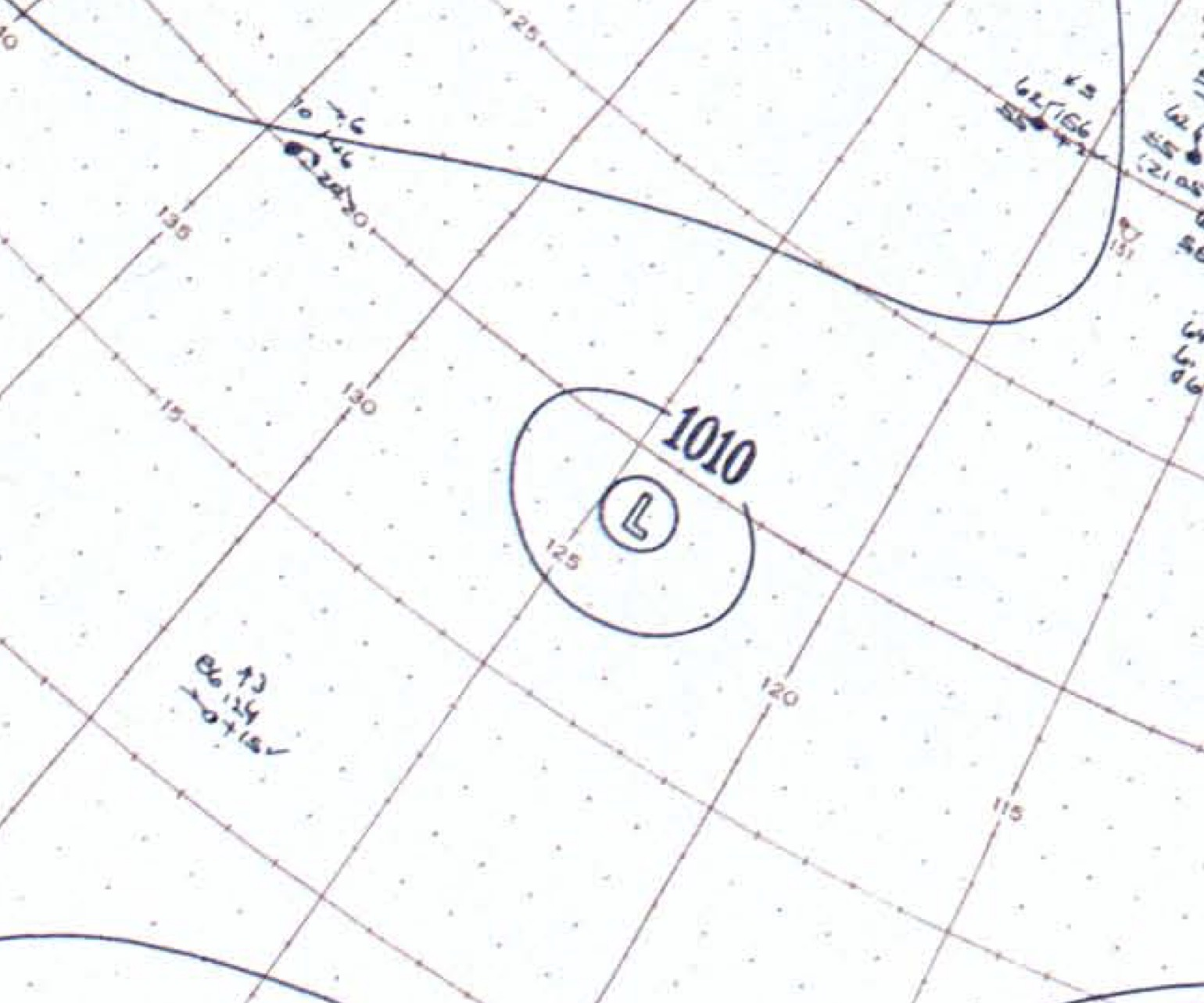
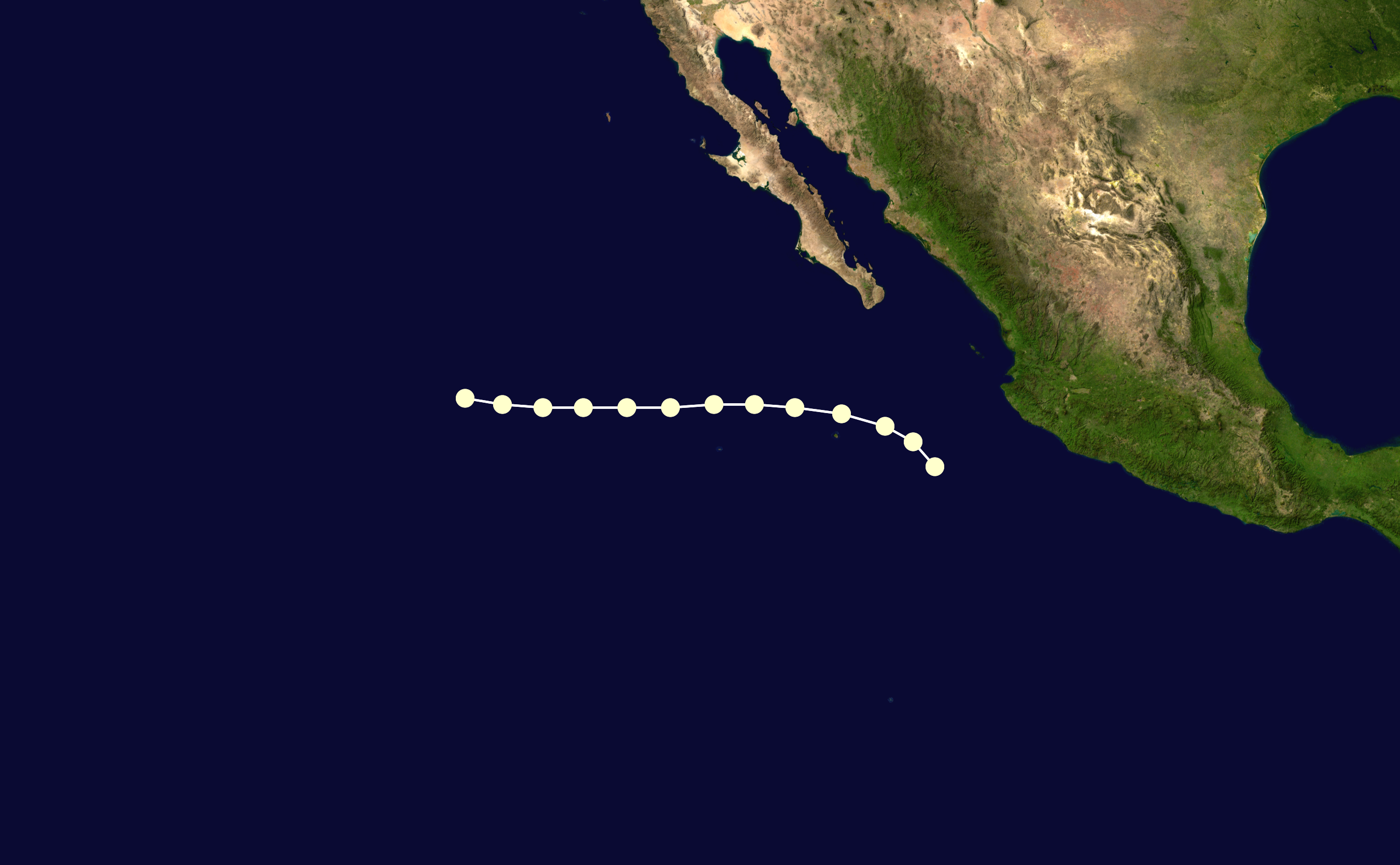
- Duration: July 9 – July 12
- Peak intensity: 85 mph (140 km/h) (1-min); 999 mbar (hPa)

Hurricane Five existed from July 9 to July 12.

=== Tropical Storm Six ===
- Tropical storm (SSHWS)
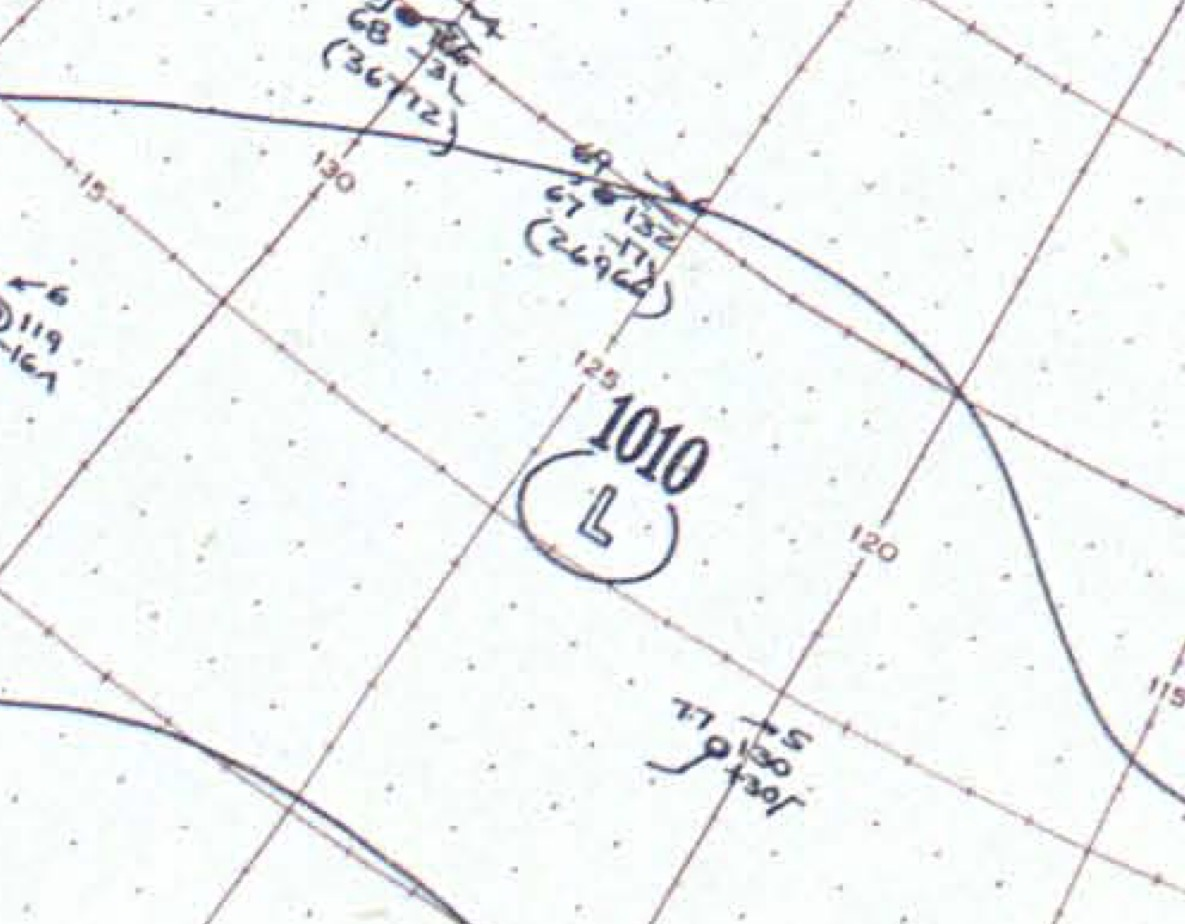
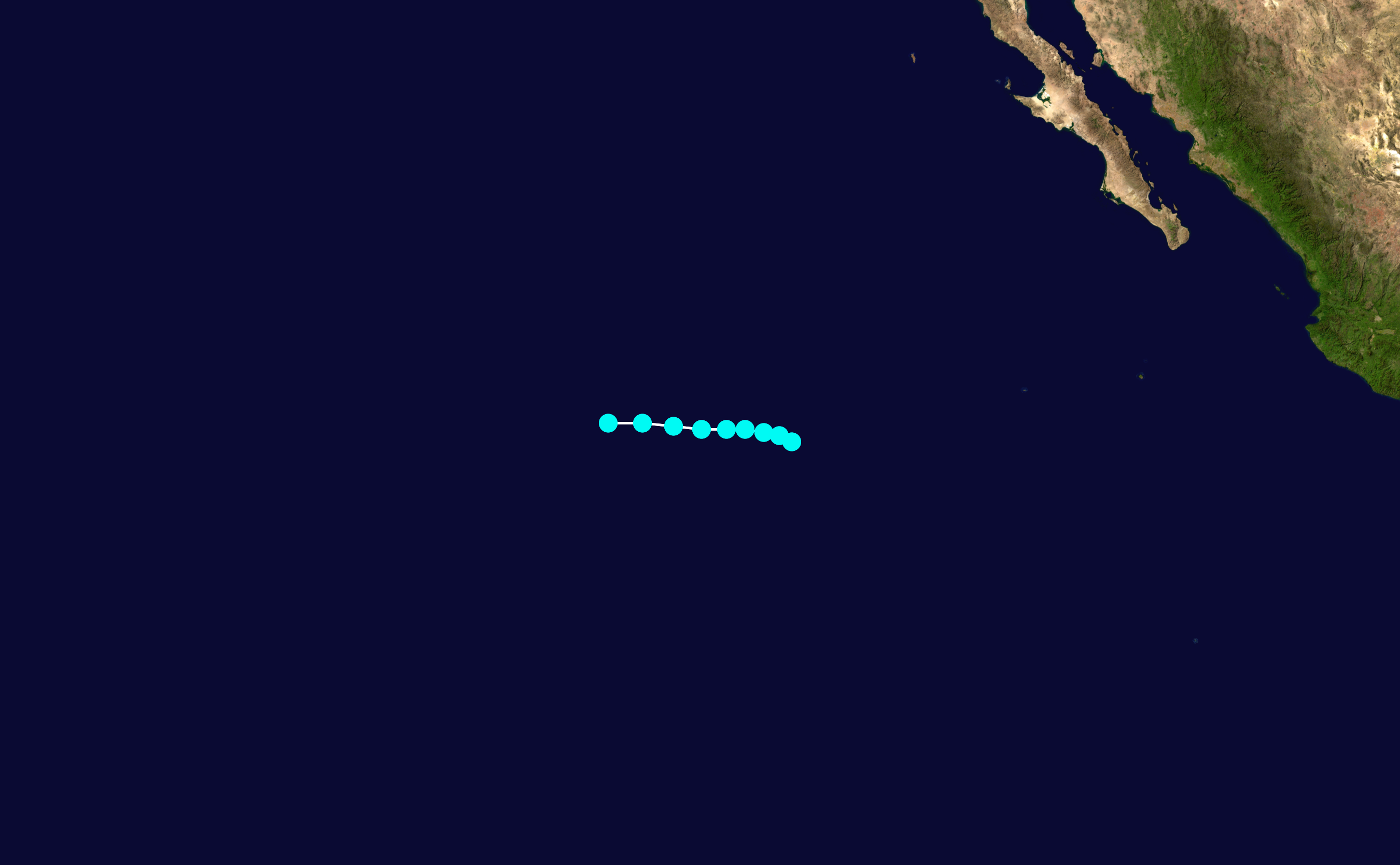
- Duration: July 14 – July 16
- Peak intensity: 50 mph (85 km/h) (1-min); 998 mbar (hPa)

Tropical Storm Six existed from July 14 to July 16.

=== Hurricane Seven ===
- Category 1 hurricane (SSHWS)
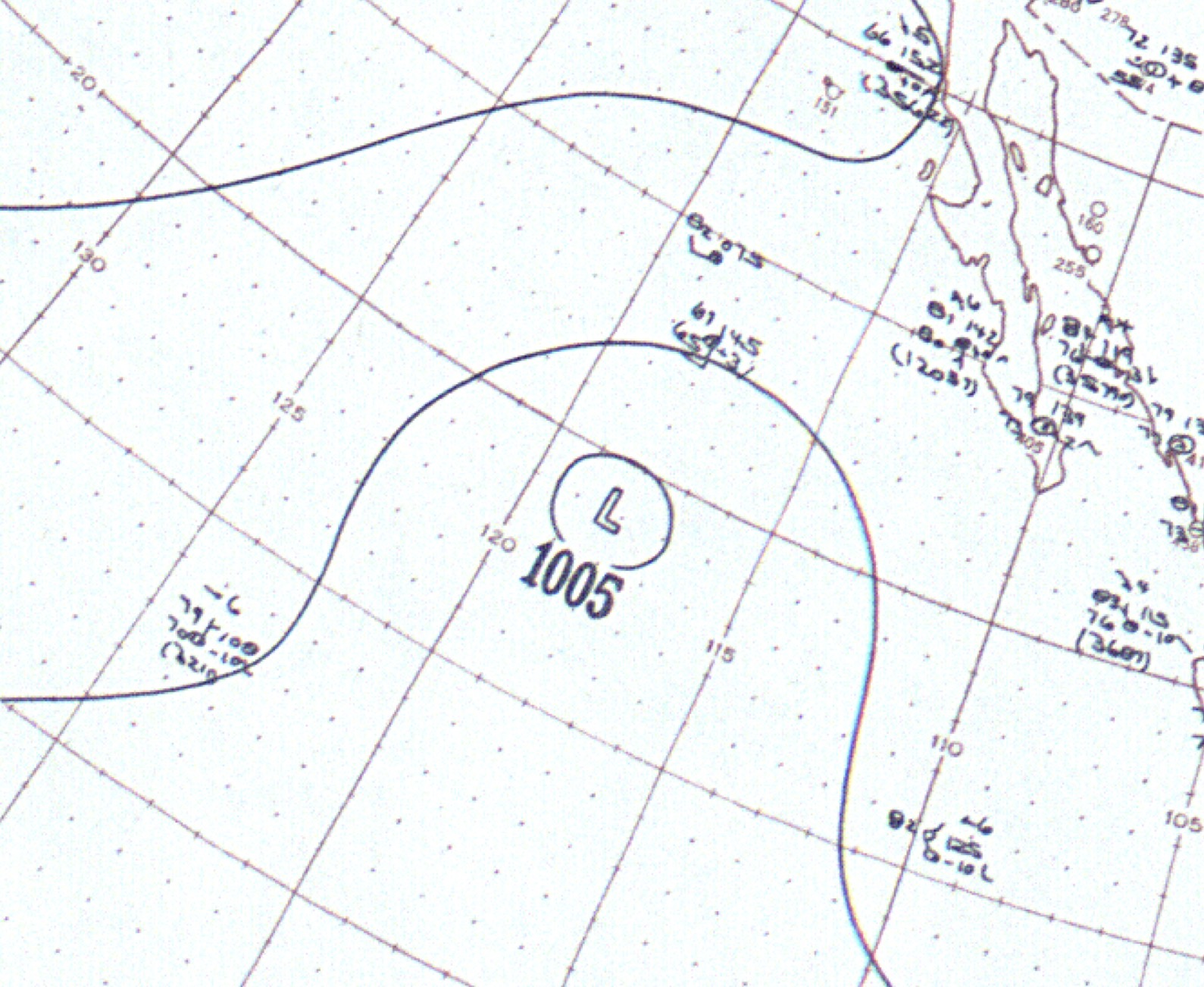
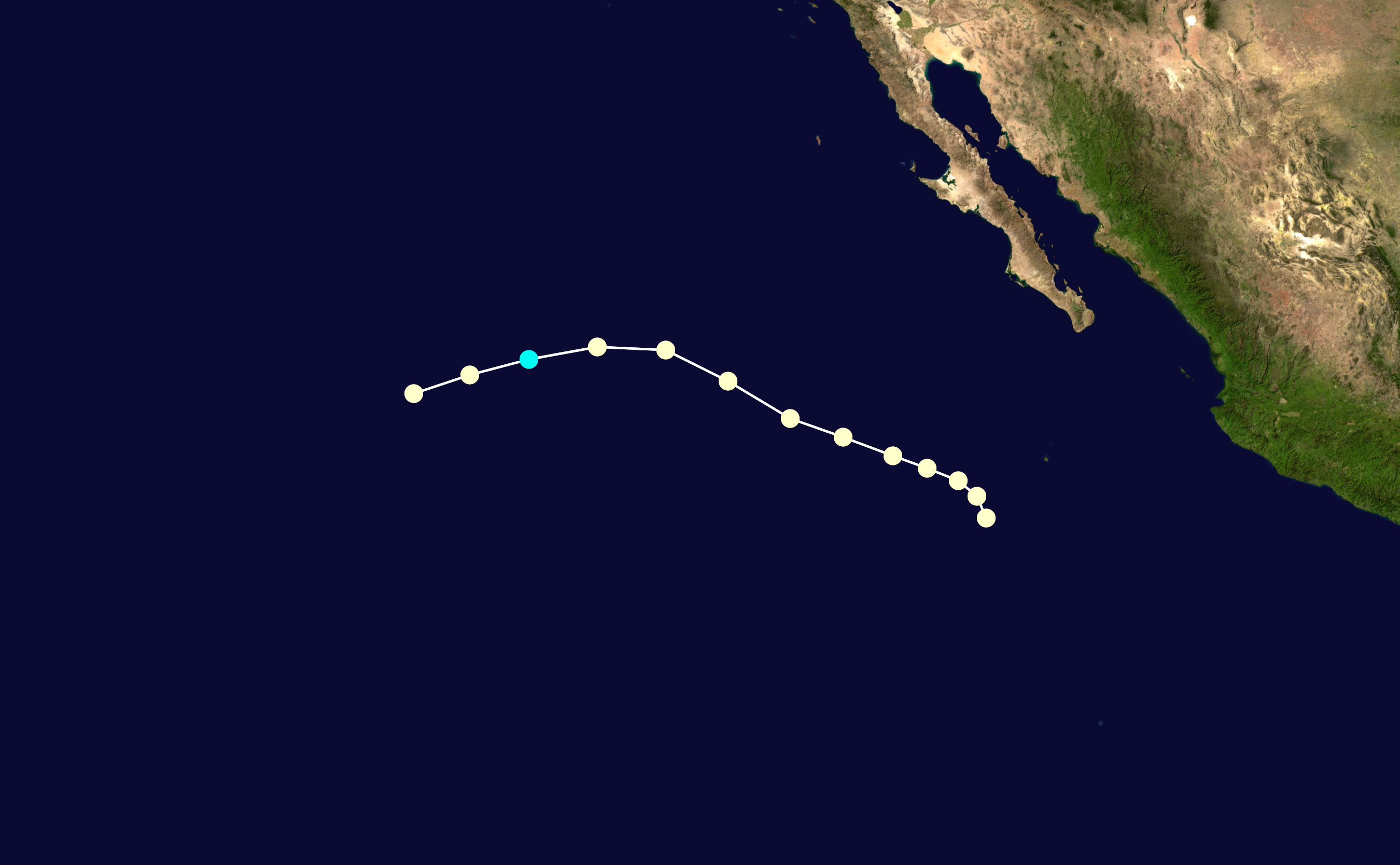
- Duration: August 22 – August 25
- Peak intensity: 85 mph (140 km/h) (1-min); 997 mbar (hPa)

Hurricane Seven existed from August 22 to August 25.

=== Tropical Storm Eight ===
- Tropical storm (SSHWS)
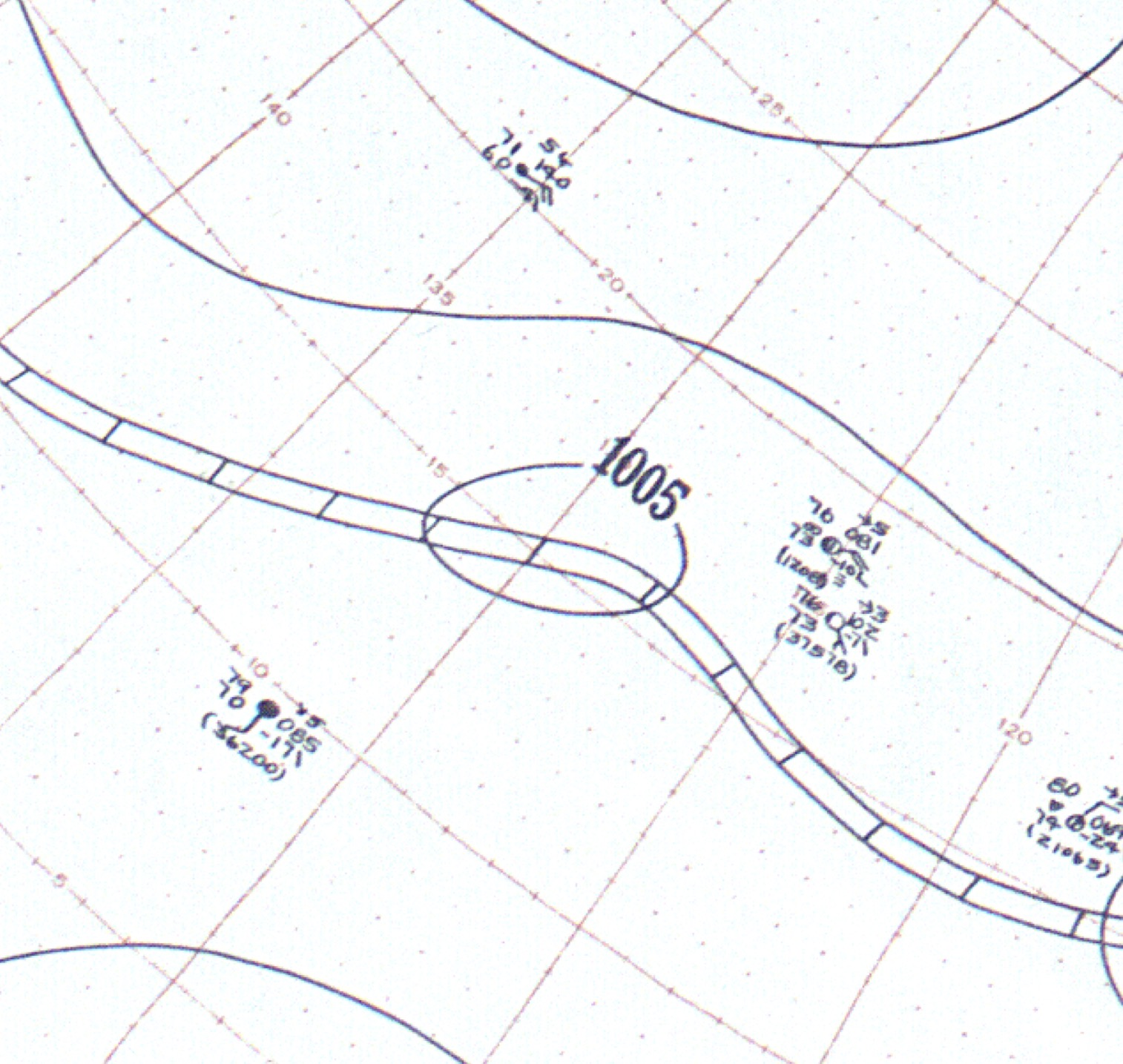
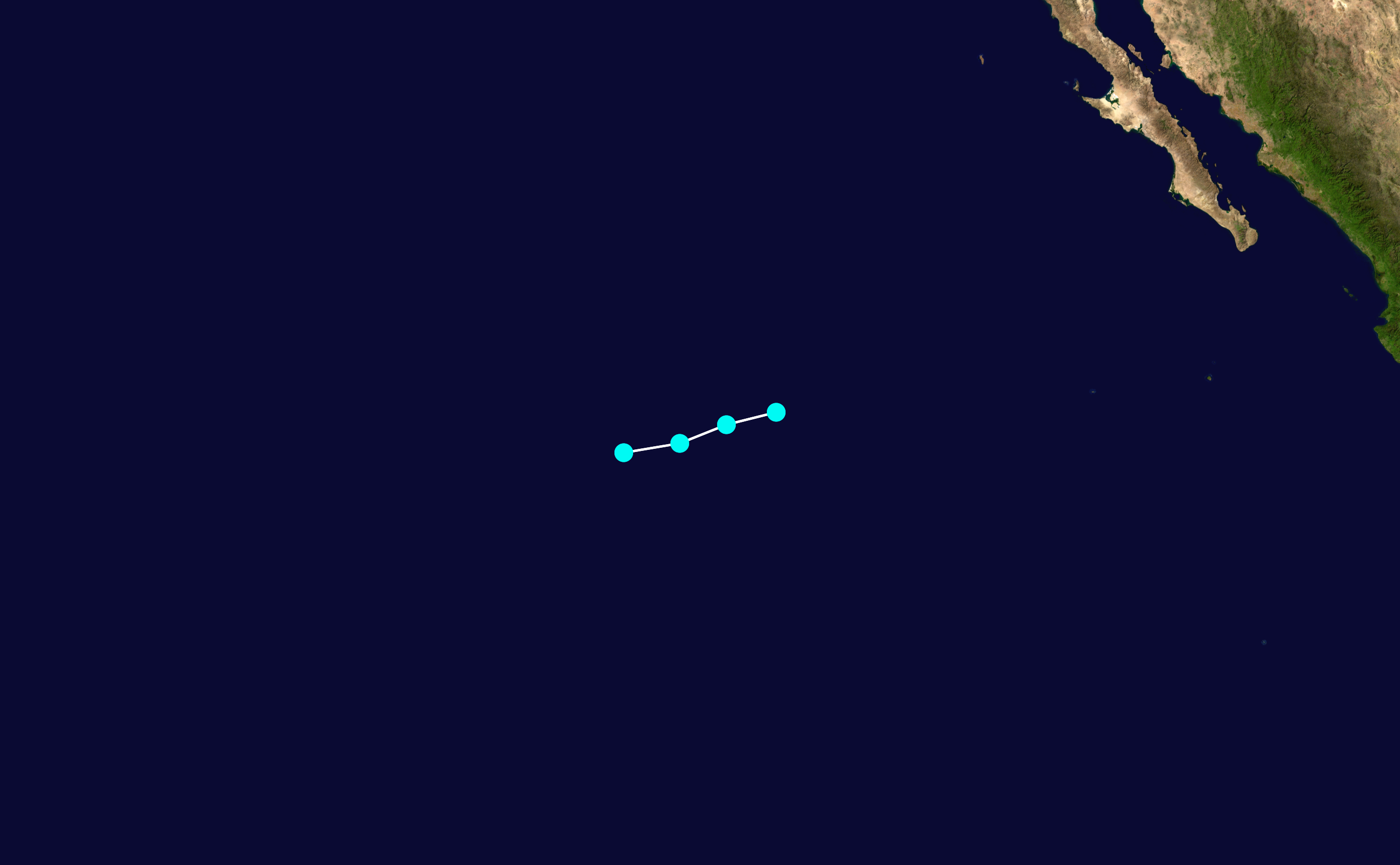
- Duration: September 3 – September 3
- Peak intensity: 50 mph (85 km/h) (1-min); 1006 mbar (hPa)

Tropical Storm Eight existed on September 3.

=== Hurricane Nine ===
- Category 1 hurricane (SSHWS)
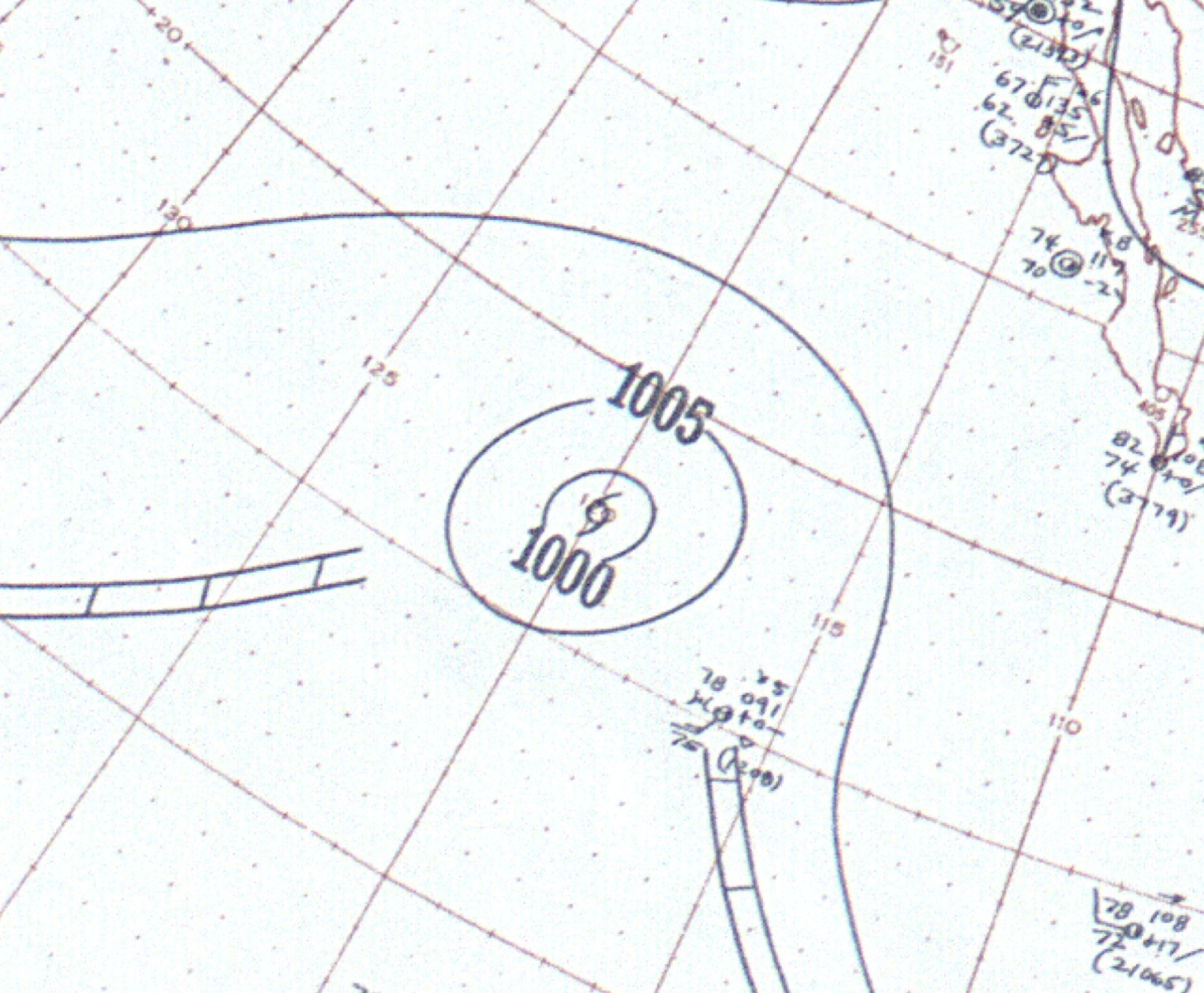
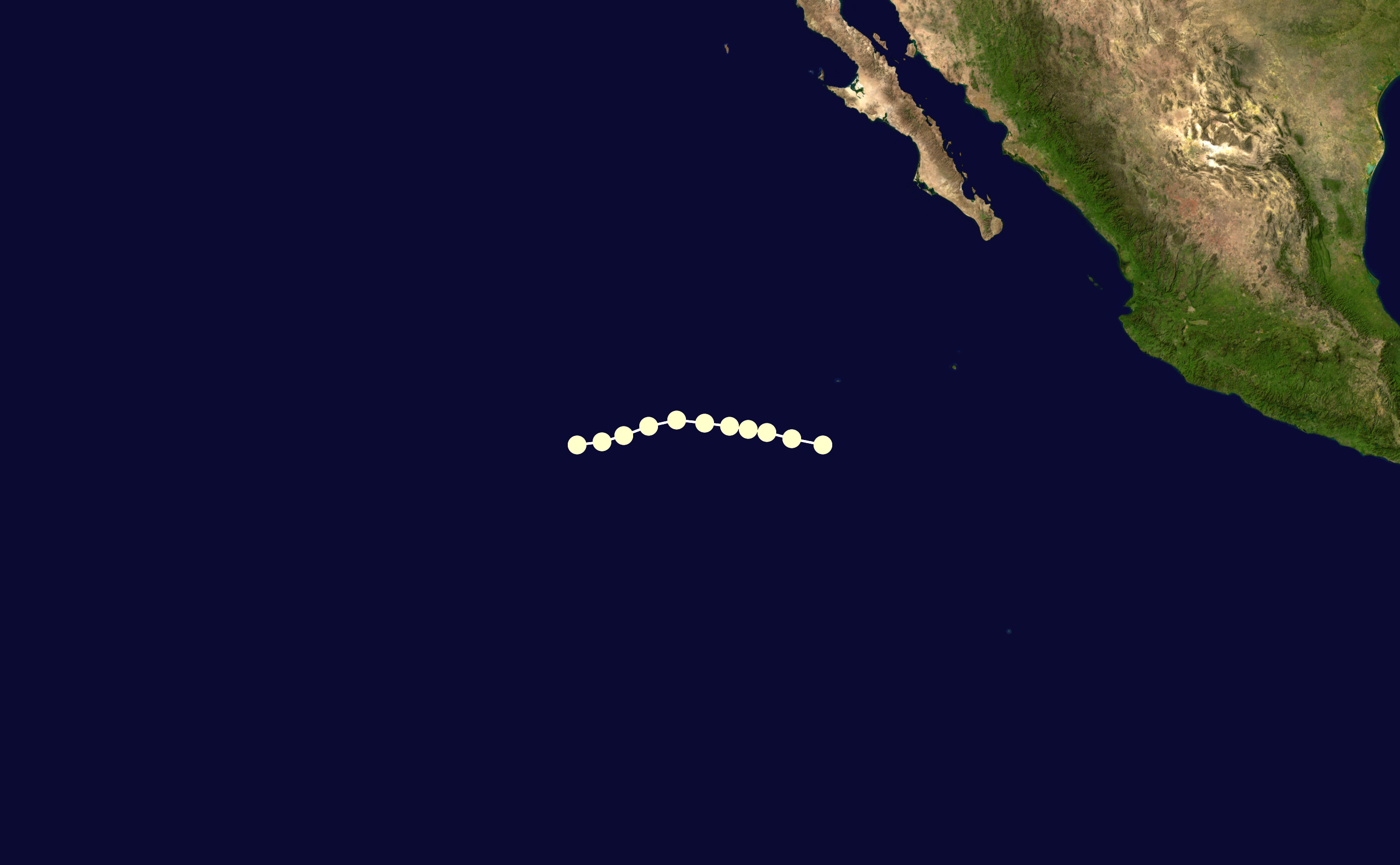
- Duration: September 4 – September 6
- Peak intensity: 85 mph (140 km/h) (1-min); 990 mbar (hPa)

Hurricane Nine existed from September 4 to September 6.

=== Hurricane Ten ===
- Category 1 hurricane (SSHWS)
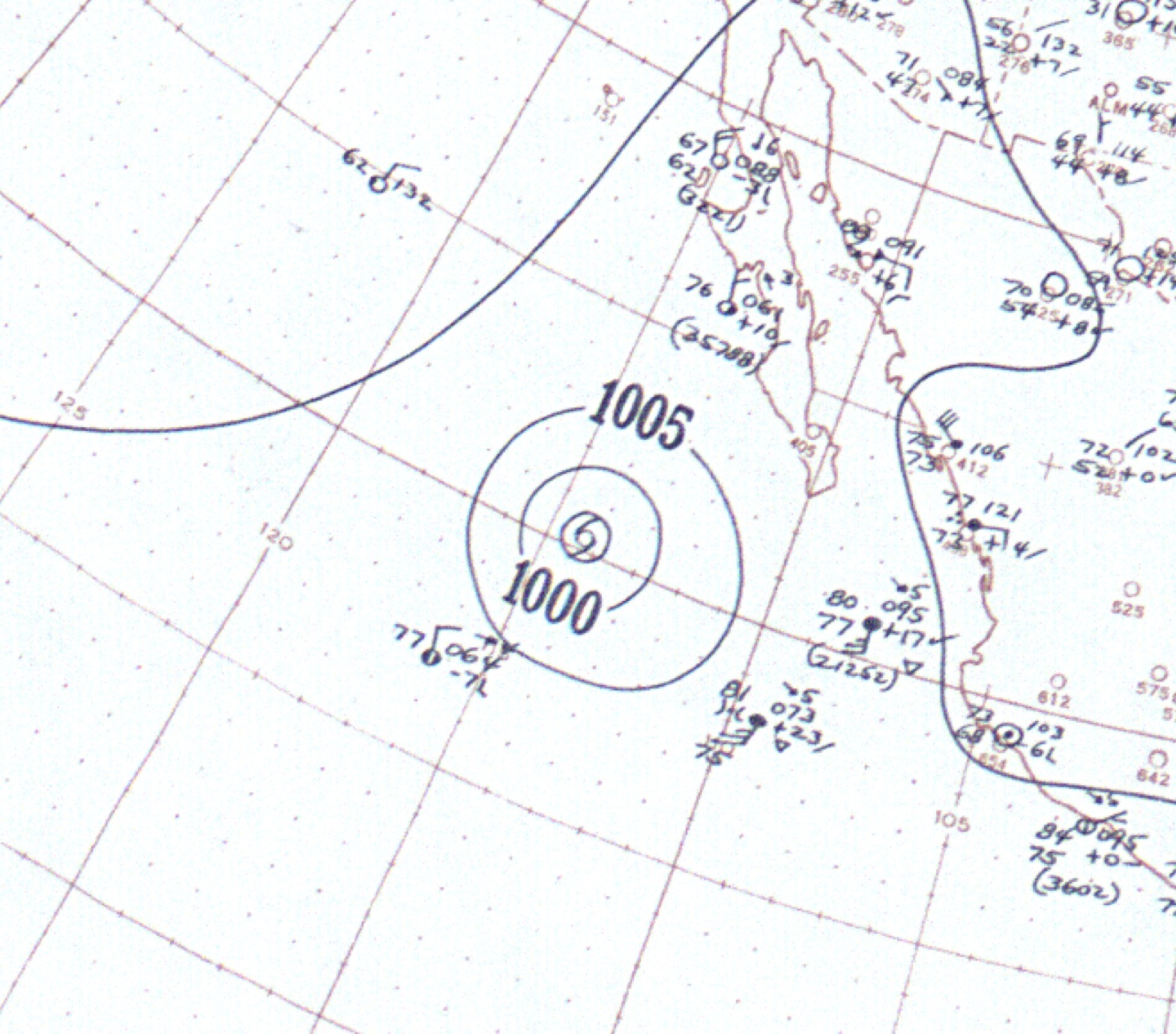
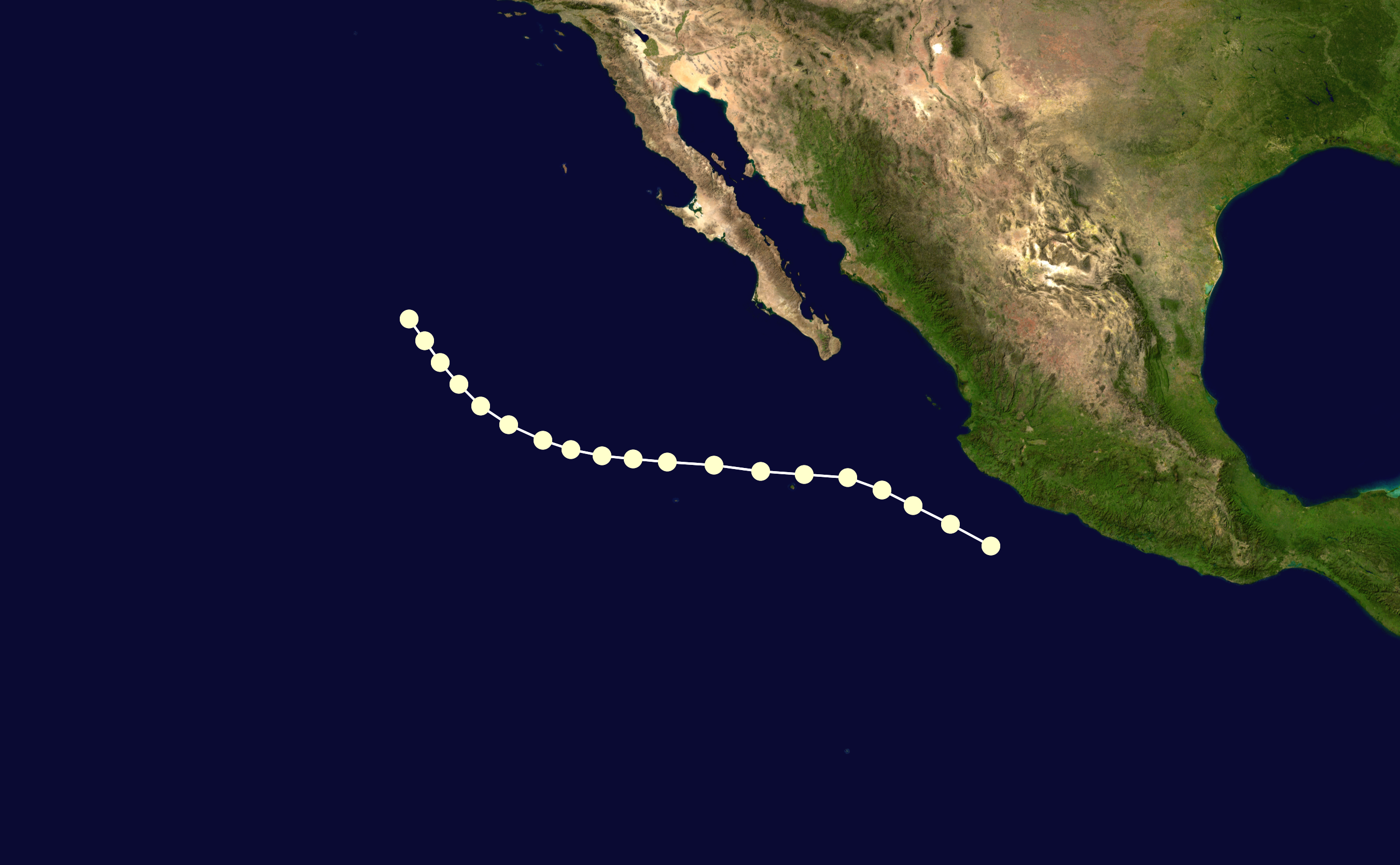
- Duration: September 12 – September 17
- Peak intensity: 85 mph (140 km/h) (1-min); 986 mbar (hPa)

Hurricane Ten existed from September 12 to September 17.

=== Tropical Storm Eleven ===
- Tropical storm (SSHWS)
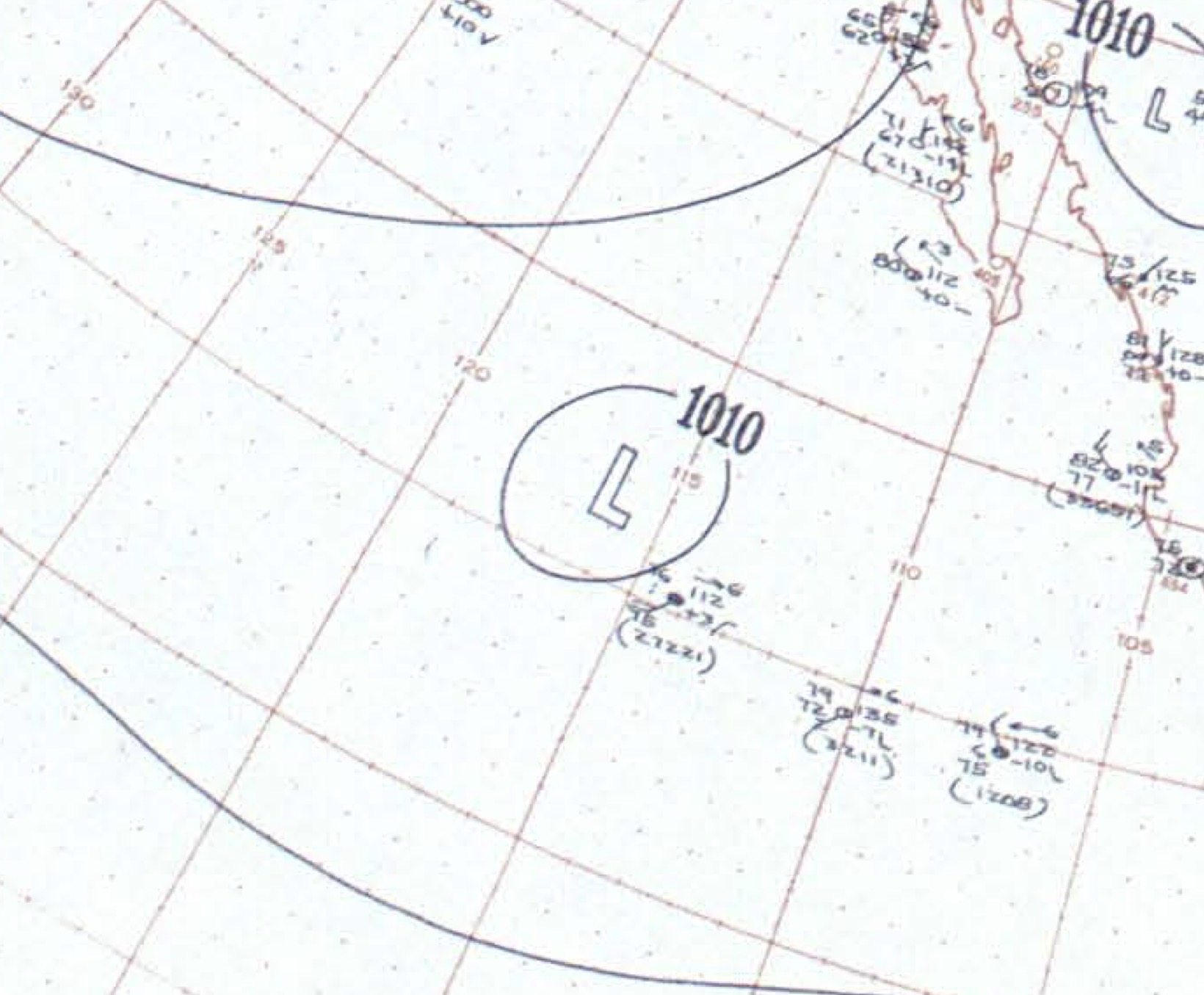
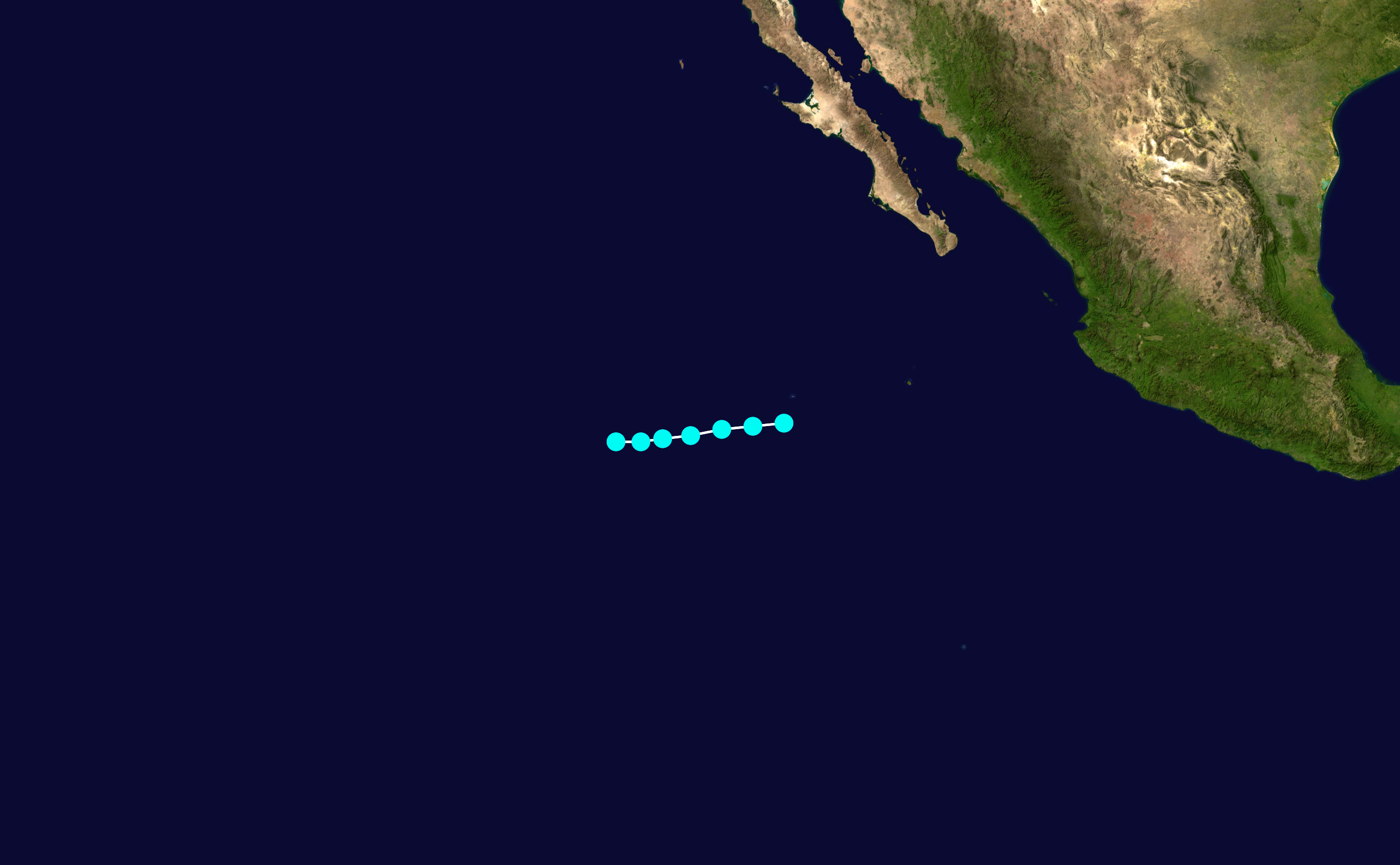
- Duration: October 16 – October 18
- Peak intensity: 50 mph (85 km/h) (1-min); 1006 mbar (hPa)

A tropical storm formed in mid-October.

== See also ==
- List of Pacific hurricanes
- Australian region cyclone seasons: 1955–56 1956–57
- South Pacific cyclone seasons: 1955–56 1956–57
- South-West Indian Ocean cyclone seasons: 1955–56 1956–57
