= Tropical Storm Irina =

2012 tropical cyclone which devastated South Africa, Mozambique, and Madagascar

Severe Tropical Storm Irina
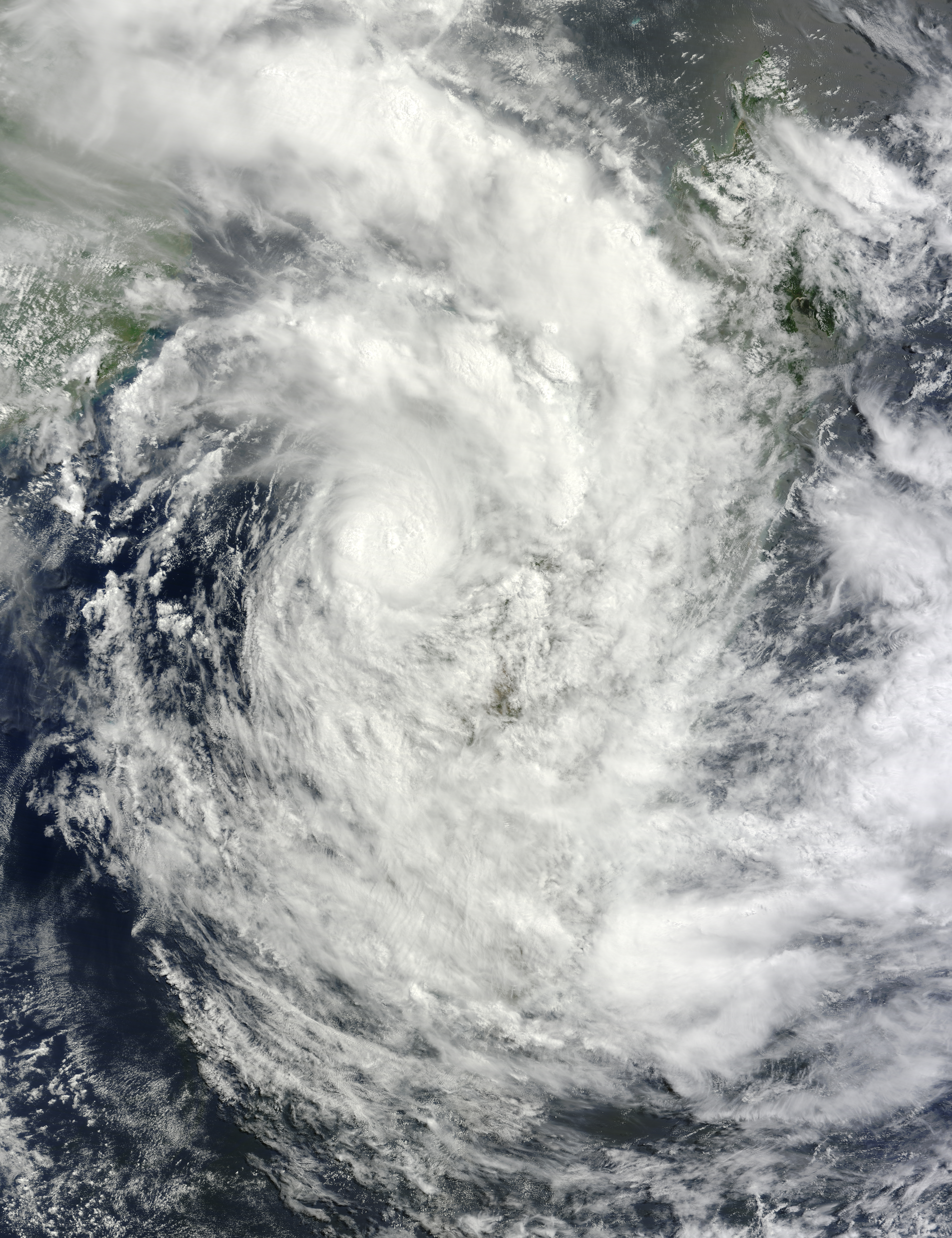
- Tropical Storm Irina off the coast of Madagascar on 1 March

Meteorological history
- Formed: 25 February 2012
- Extratropical: 12 March 2012
- Dissipated: 14 March 2012

Severe tropical storm
- 10-minute sustained (MFR)
- Highest winds: 95 km/h (60 mph)
- Lowest pressure: 978 hPa (mbar); 28.88 inHg

Tropical storm
- 1-minute sustained (SSHWS/JTWC)
- Highest winds: 100 km/h (65 mph)
- Lowest pressure: 978 hPa (mbar); 28.88 inHg

Overall effects
- Fatalities: 77 total
- Damage: Unknown
- Areas affected: Madagascar, Mozambique, South Africa
- IBTrACS
- Part of the 2011–12 South-West Indian Ocean cyclone season

Severe Tropical Storm Irina was a large tropical cyclone that brought gusty winds and torrential rain across Madagascar, Mozambique, and South Africa. Irina is considered one of the most devastating systems of the 2011–12 season. Irina formed from a tropical wave that was located north of Madagascar. The disturbance continued to move south and became Irina on February 27. Irina moved parallel to the Madagascar coast, causing extreme flooding which claimed 77 lives. The system still has an unknown damage total.

== Meteorological history ==
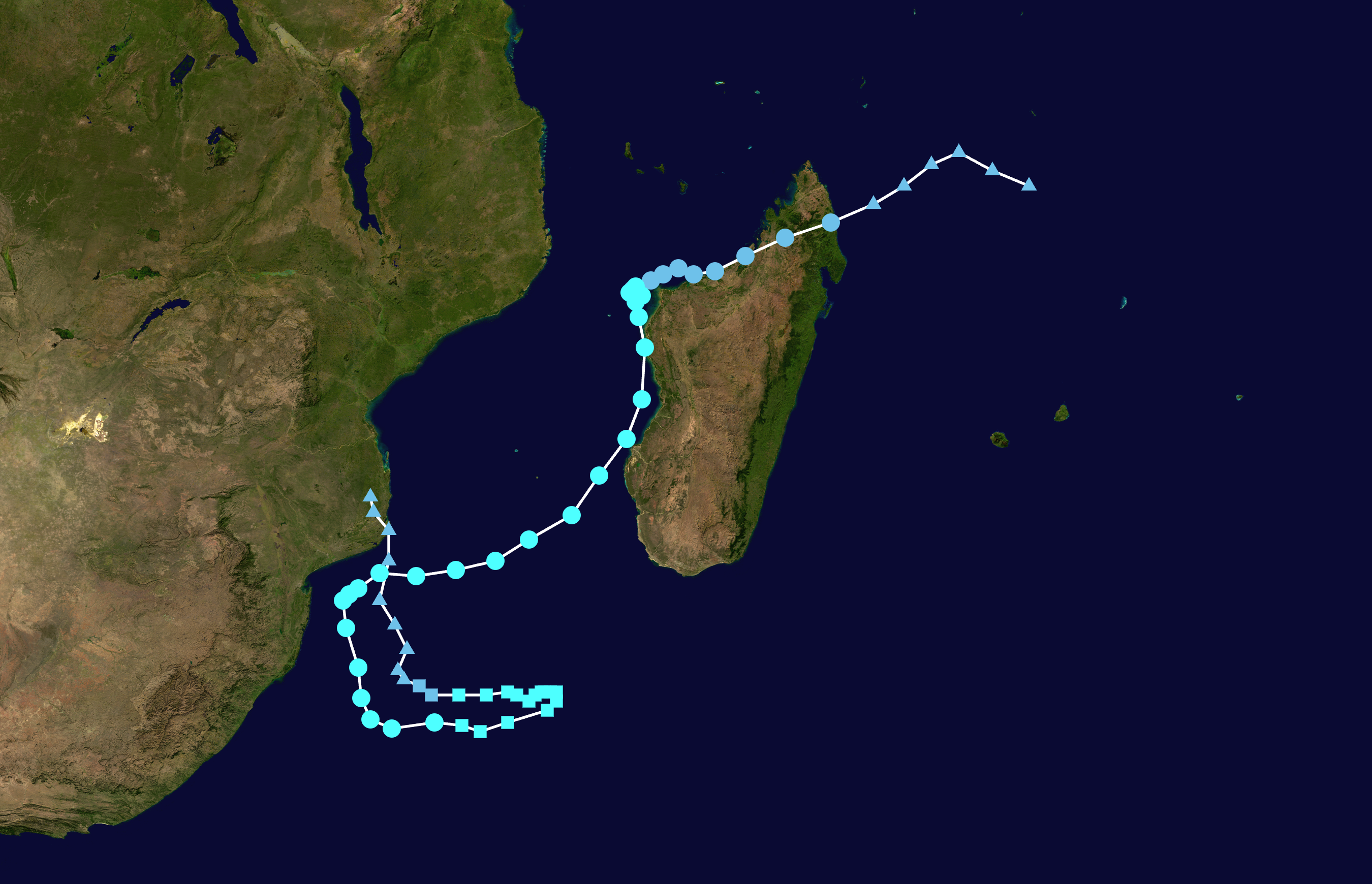
Storm path Map key Saffir–Simpson scale Tropical depression (≤38 mph, ≤62 km/h) Tropical storm (39–73 mph, 63–118 km/h) Category 1 (74–95 mph, 119–153 km/h) Category 2 (96–110 mph, 154–177 km/h) Category 3 (111–129 mph, 178–208 km/h) Category 4 (130–156 mph, 209–251 km/h) Category 5 (≥157 mph, ≥252 km/h) Unknown Storm type Tropical cyclone Subtropical cyclone Extratropical cyclone, remnant low, tropical disturbance, or monsoon depression

On 22 February, an area of disturbed weather formed in the South-West Indian Ocean. The system steadily strengthened into a low pressure area shortly afterwards. With favorable conditions, ample convection was able to wrap around the low level circulation center, which allowed the system to strengthen into a tropical depression, on 25 February. On 26 February, RSMC La Reunion upgraded the system to Moderate Tropical Storm Irina as it continued to intensify. However, Irina made landfall on Northern Madagascar a few hours later and weakened into an overland depression. On 27 February, Irina emerged off the northwestern coast of Madagascar. Within the next several hours, Irina was able to strengthen slightly, as the storm moved very close along the coast of Madagascar. Later on the same day, Irina made landfall a second time on Madagascar, this time at Northwest Madagascar. Late on 27 February, Irina weakened into a Zone of Disturbed Weather, while it was overland. Early on 28 February, Irina emerged off the western coast of Madagascar.Later on the same day, Irina regained tropical depression intensity, and slowly began to reorganize. However, for the next day, Irina was unable to regain Moderate Tropical Storm intensity, because of poor organization, and because the storm's low level circulation center was displaced, well to the east of the storm's convection. Early on 29 February, Irina was able to reorganize sufficiently, and regained Moderate Tropical Storm status. Just a few hours later, the JTWC designated Irina as Tropical Cyclone 12S. As Irina continued to organize, the storm gradually began to strengthen, as it turned southward, along the western coast of Madagascar. On 1 March, Irina intensified into a Severe Tropical Storm, as it moved towards Western Madagascar. Late on that same day, Irina reached its peak intensity, with a minimum low pressure of 979 mbars. Early on 5 March, Irina weakened into a Moderate Tropical Storm.

The system then made a small loop off the coasts of Mozambique and South Africa before starting to head in a northwestern direction towards Madagascar yet again due to weak steering conditions. Later on 6 March, wind shear began taking its toll on the system, and much of the storm's convection in the outer rain band were eroded away. As the storm continued to move towards Southern Madagascar, the wind shear removed more of the storm's convection, even as the storm continued to weaken. On 7 March, Irina began to stall. Early on 8 March, only a small amount of convection remained, which was wrapped around the center of circulation. Early on 9 March, Irina's eye disappeared, as the storm continued to weaken. As the storm turned back towards South Africa, it lost its organization, due to the strong wind shear. Early on 10 March, RSMC Reunion issued their last advisory on Irina, as the storm transitioned into a subtropical storm. Over the next 2 days, Irina's remnant low continued to drift northwestwards, with Irina weakening into a remnant low on 12 March. Two days later, Irina's remnants made landfall over the Gaza Province of Mozambique and dissipated.

== Preparation and impact ==
Once Irina began to move along the coast of Madagascar, it brought severe floods and many landslides which claimed nearly 72 lives, with almost 911 misplaced near Antananarivo. Several authorities along the western coast said that the storm destroyed nearly 1,348 homes and caused landslides which blocked several roads which isolated several villages.

The official death toll as of 6 March stood at 77, including at least 65 dead in the island nation, most of them in the southeastern Ifanadiana district. Five fishermen were killed of the Mozambique coast and at least 3 more people in the south of the country when a tree fell on their roof and collapsed it. South Africa reported four fatalities as waves of up to 3 m (9.8 ft) battered the port of Durban and forced all ships to seek safety. Irina was the deadliest storm of the season, and took the total death toll of the 2011–12 season to 164, the highest since the 2006–07 season.

== See also ==
- Cyclone Ivan
- 2011–12 South-West Indian Ocean cyclone season
