= 2011–12 South-West Indian Ocean cyclone season =

Cyclone season in the Southwest Indian Ocean

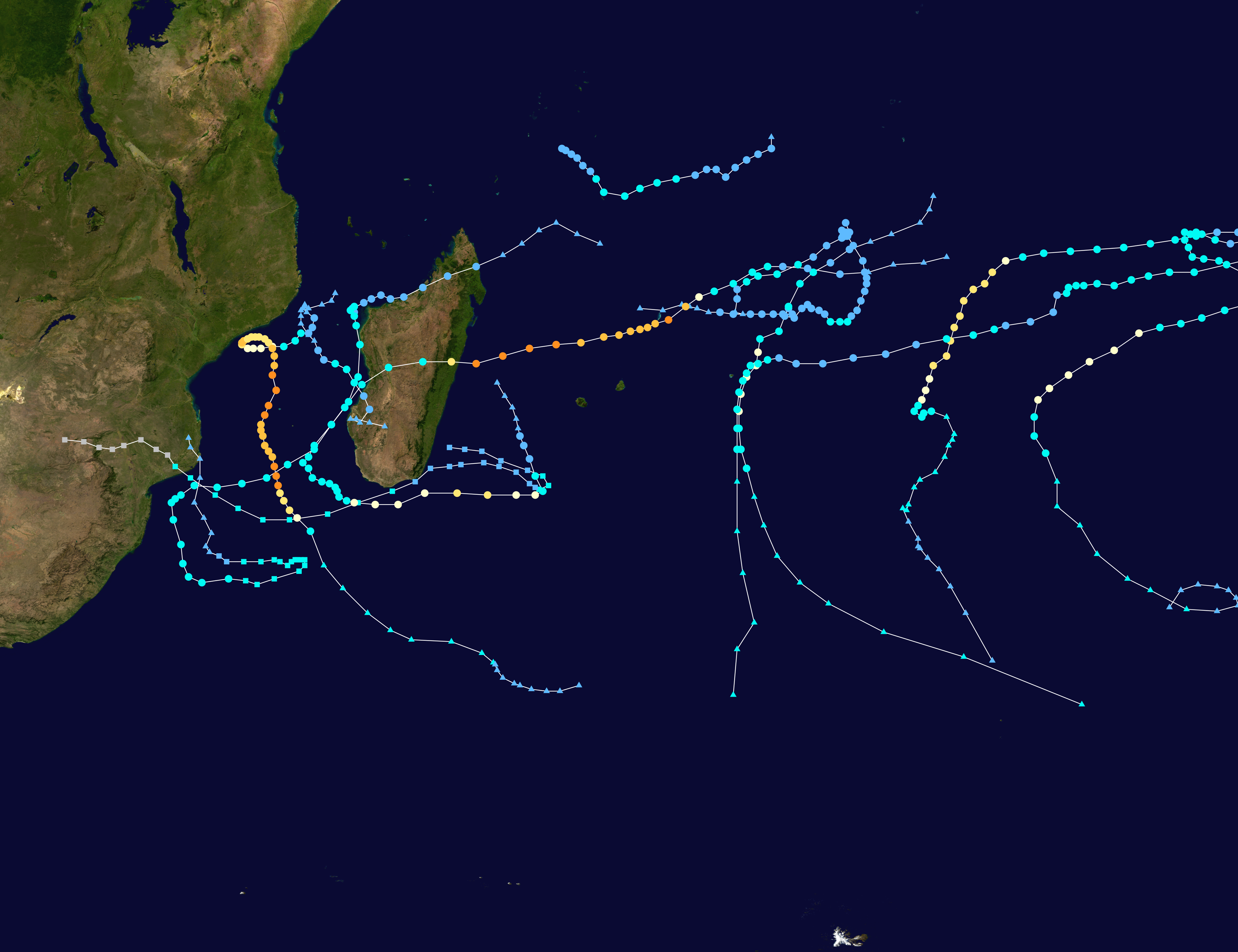
- Season summary map

Seasonal boundaries
- First system formed: December 4, 2011
- Last system dissipated: June 8, 2012

Strongest storm
- Name: Funso
  - Maximum winds: 205 km/h (125 mph) (10-minute sustained)
  - Lowest pressure: 925 hPa (mbar)

Seasonal statistics
- Total disturbances: 14
- Total depressions: 14
- Total storms: 10
- Tropical cyclones: 3
- Intense tropical cyclones: 2
- Total fatalities: 164 total
- Total damage: Unknown

Related articles
- 2011–12 Australian region cyclone season; 2011–12 South Pacific cyclone season

The 2011–12 South-West Indian Ocean cyclone season was a slightly above average event in tropical cyclone formation. It began on November 15, 2011, and ended on April 30, 2012, with the exception for Mauritius and the Seychelles, for which it ended on May 15, 2012. These dates conventionally delimit the period of each year when most tropical cyclones form in the region; however, Severe Tropical Storm Kuena developed in early June, after the season had officially ended. The basin is defined as the area west of 90°E and south of the Equator in the Indian Ocean, which includes the waters around Madagascar westward to the east coast of Africa. Tropical cyclones in this basin are monitored by the Regional Specialised Meteorological Centre in Réunion.

== Systems ==
=== Moderate Tropical Storm Alenga ===
- Moderate tropical storm (MFR)
- Tropical storm (SSHWS)
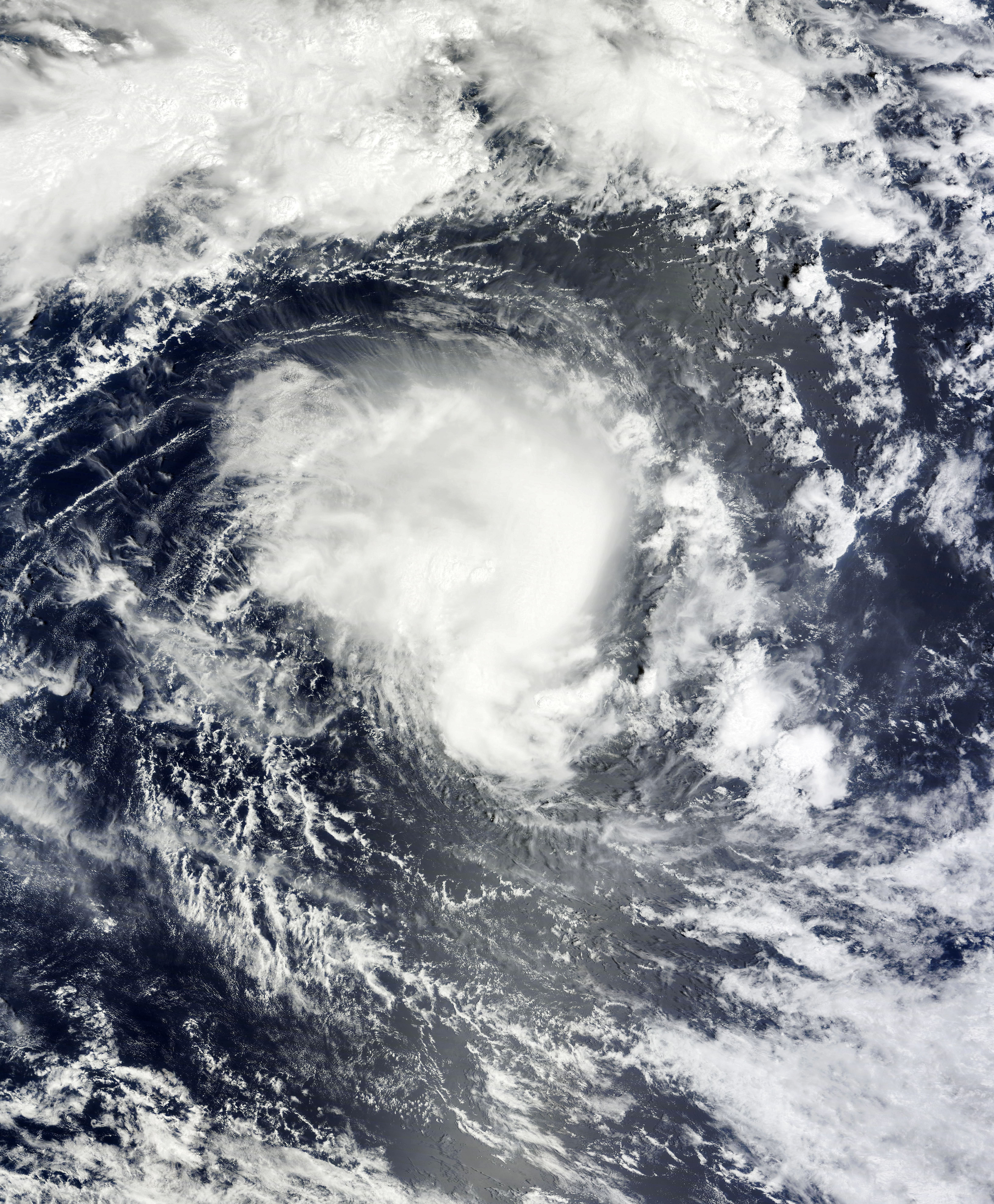
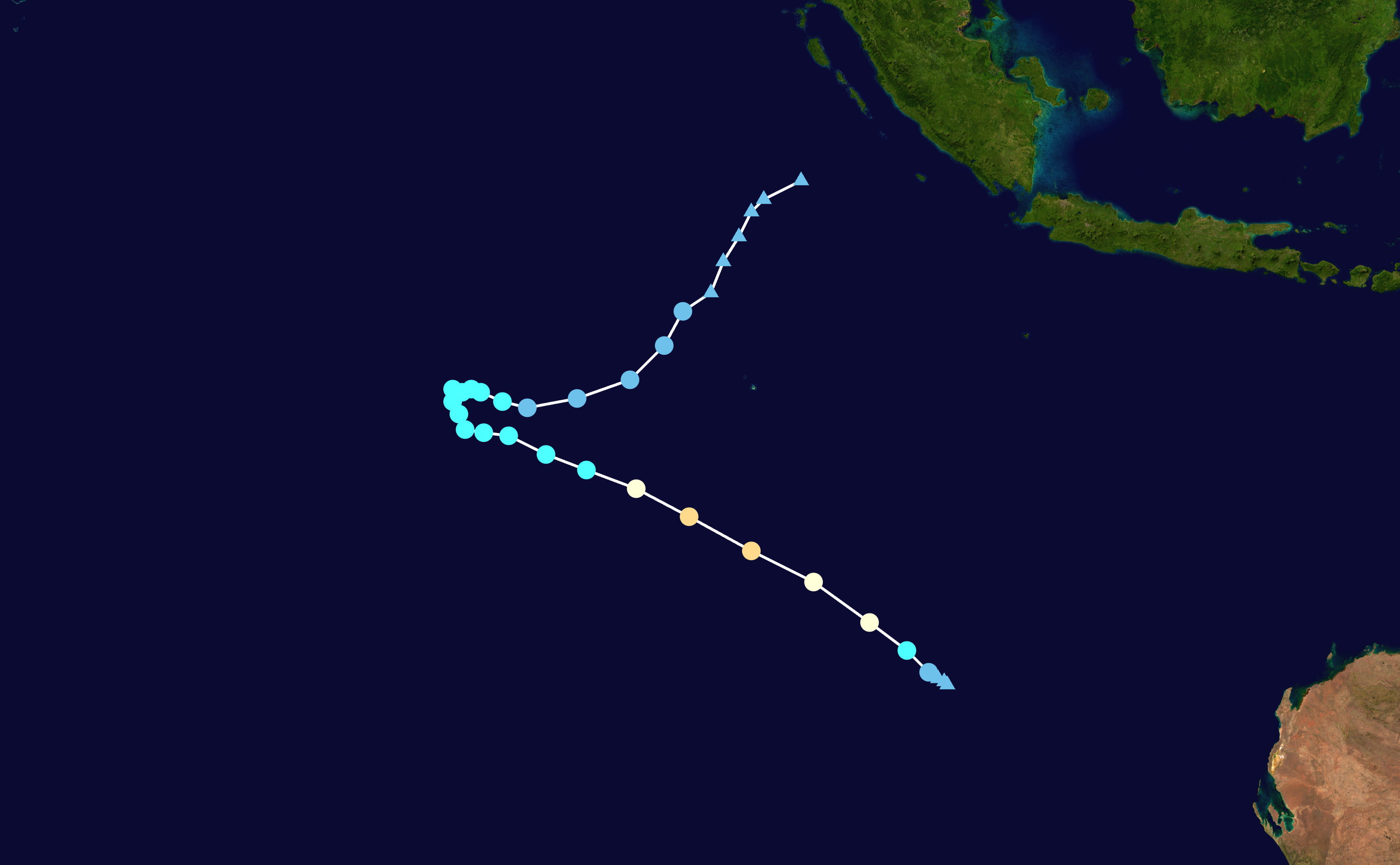
- Duration: December 4 (entered basin) – December 7 (exited basin)
- Peak intensity: 85 km/h (50 mph) (10-min); 994 hPa (mbar)

On December 5, a rapidly developing area of low pressure crossed 90°E and entered La Réunion's area of responsibility. Within hours of moving into the region, the Joint Typhoon Warning Center (JTWC) classified it as Tropical Cyclone 01S. By this time, a banding eye feature was apparent on satellite imagery. Favorable atmospheric conditions allowed convection to increase in intensity and coverage over its center and good outflow. Several hours later, La Réunion reported that the system had intensified into a Moderate Tropical Storm, with the Mauritius Meteorological service naming it Alenga. The name was contributed by Kenya. Continuing to rapidly intensify, Alenga strengthened into a severe tropical storm later that day. Although predicted to intensify into a tropical cyclone, Alenga weakened near midday December 6, and was downgraded to moderate tropical storm status before it moved out of the South-West Indian Ocean (SWIO) and into the Australian region, early on December 7.

=== Tropical Depression 02 ===
- Tropical depression (MFR)
- Tropical storm (SSHWS)
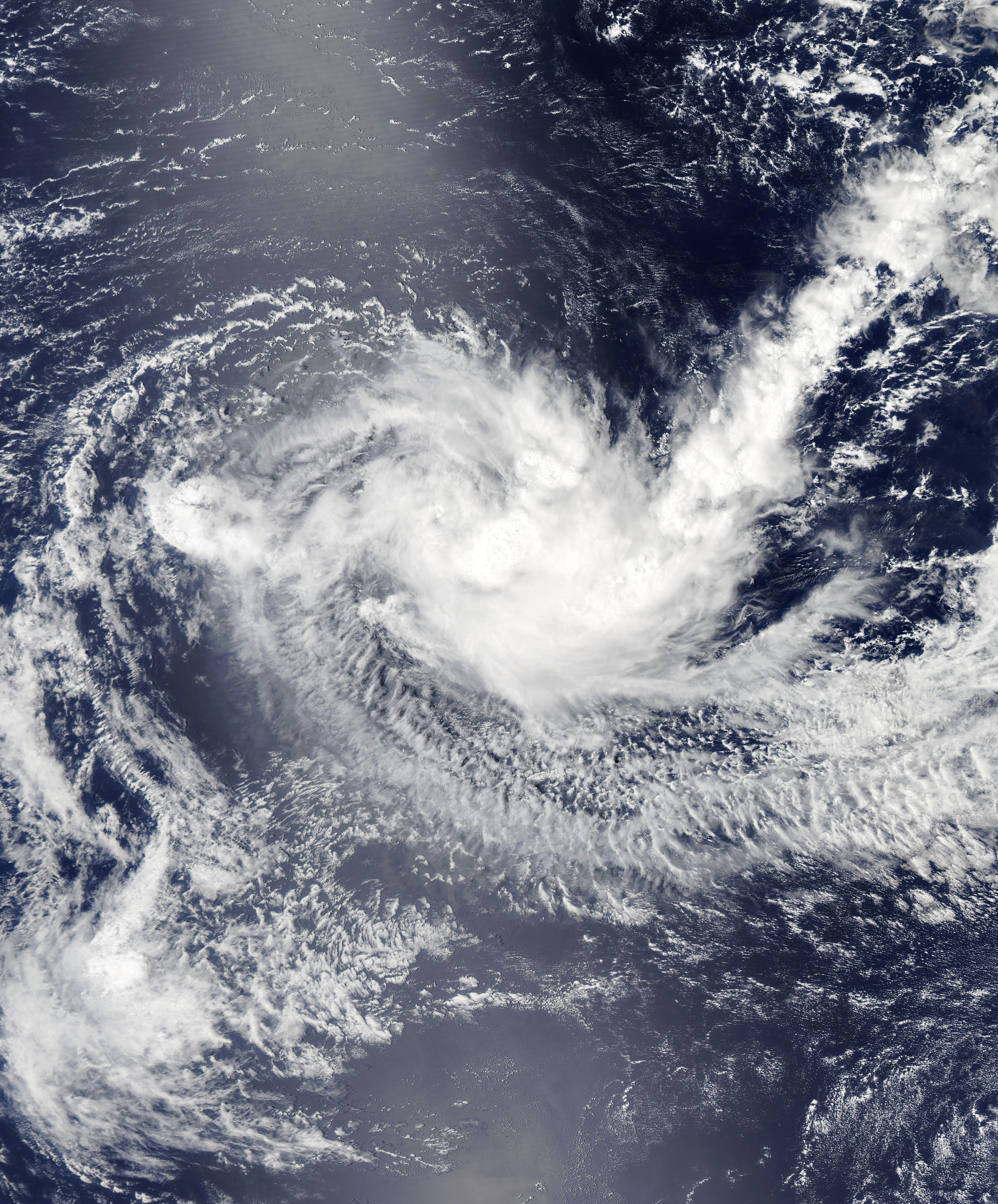
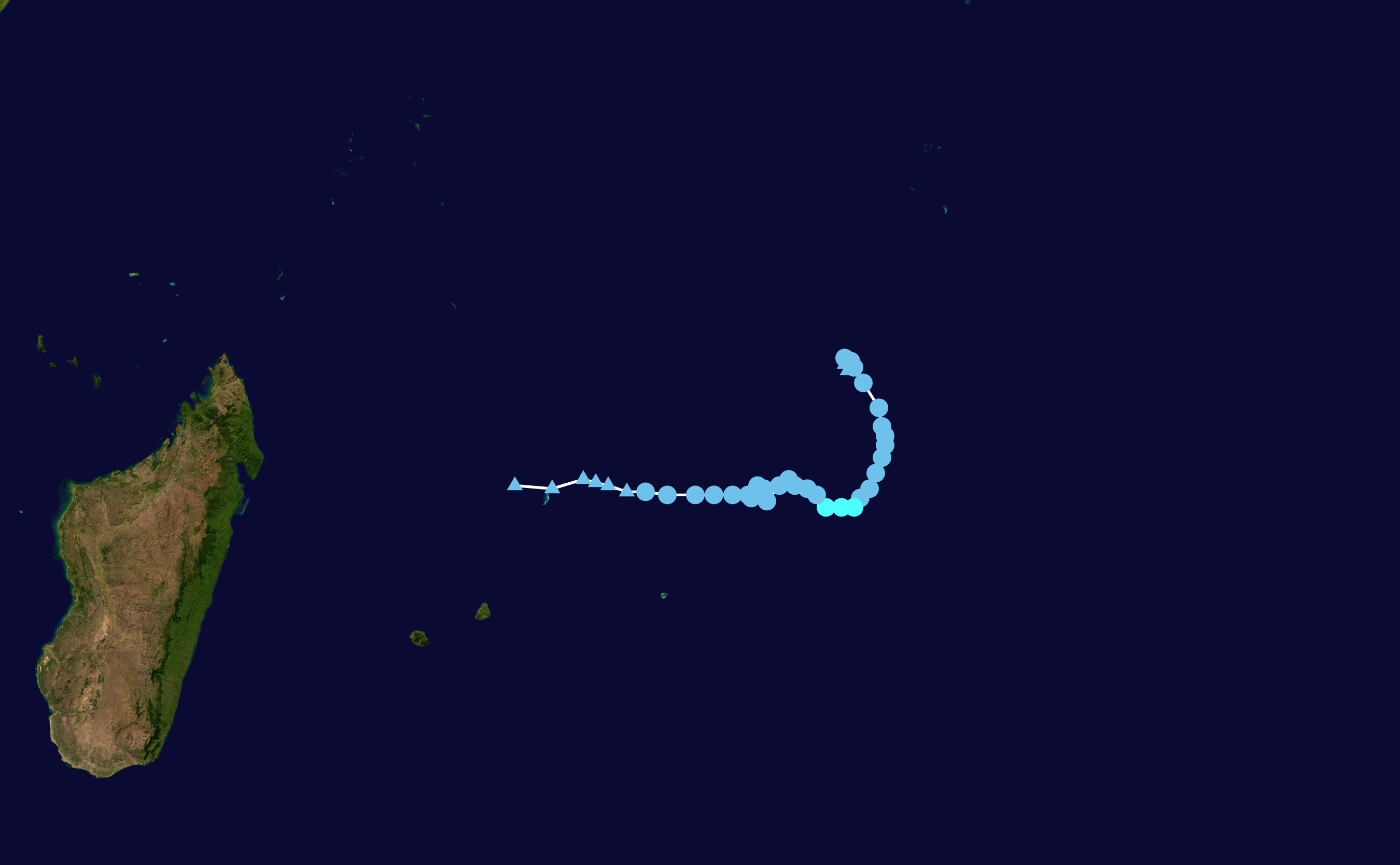
- Duration: December 6 – December 9
- Peak intensity: 55 km/h (35 mph) (10-min); 998 hPa (mbar)

On December 6, Météo-France declared a tropical disturbance a tropical depression. On December 7, the cyclone entered an area of strong vertical wind shear causing the low level circulation centre to become exposed. Soon afterwards, Tropical Depression 02 dissipated to a remnant low. However, early on December 8, the system regenerated into a weak tropical depression. Later on December 8, convection redeveloped, and wrapped around the low level center, even as the storm continued moving westward, as it slowly weakened. Late on December 9, Météo-France issued their last advisory on the storm as it weakened below tropical depression intensity. However, the remnants continued to persist for the next several days with an exposed low level circulation center. But on December 16, the remnants dissipated completely in open waters, due to the high wind shear.

=== Subtropical Depression 03 ===
- Subtropical depression (MFR)
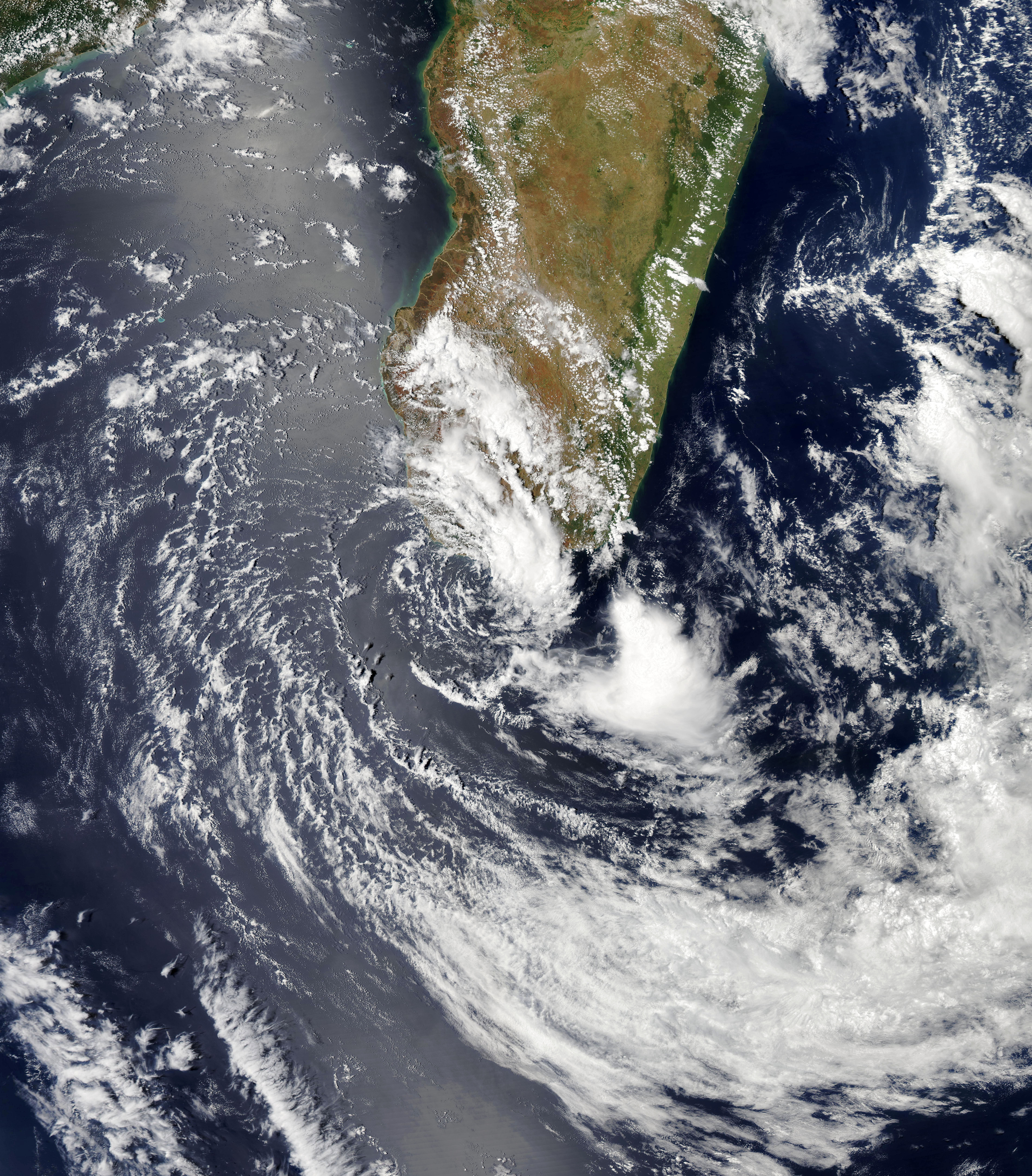
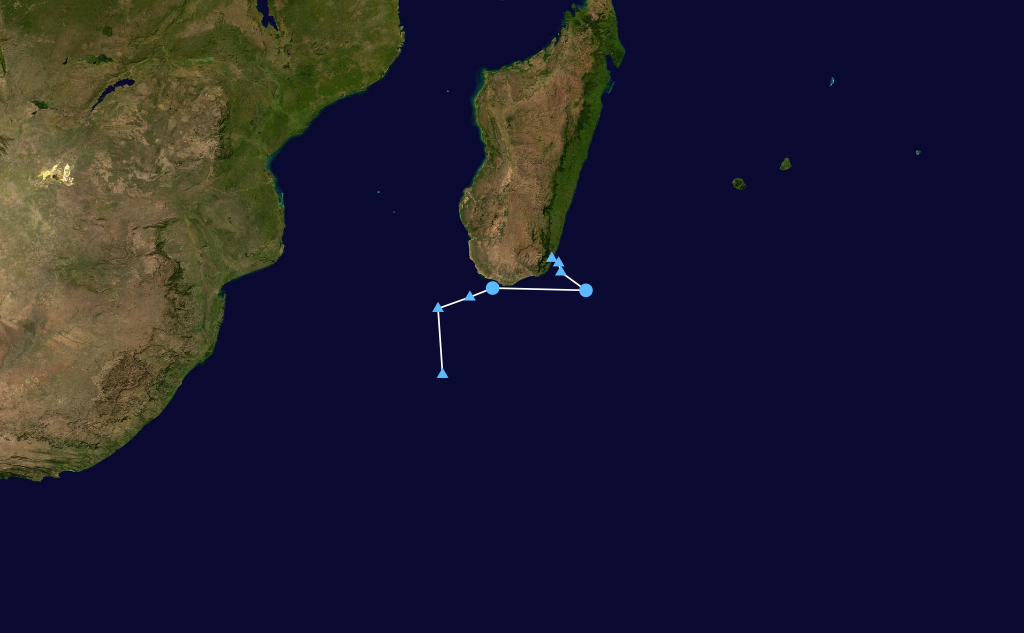
- Duration: December 19 – December 23
- Peak intensity: 55 km/h (35 mph) (10-min); 1000 hPa (mbar)

An area of low pressure located near the southeastern coast of Madagascar, that was previously being tracked by the JTWC as Invest 93S, was designated a subtropical depression by Météo-France, on December 19. The system did not move much, and persisted through the 20th. However, on December 21, the subtropical depression began to weaken as it moved southward very slowly. Late on December 23, Météo-France issued their last advisory on the storm as it dissipated.

Heavy rainfall related to the depression killed 43 people in Madagascar.

=== Tropical Cyclone Benilde ===
- Tropical cyclone (MFR)
- Category 2 tropical cyclone (SSHWS)
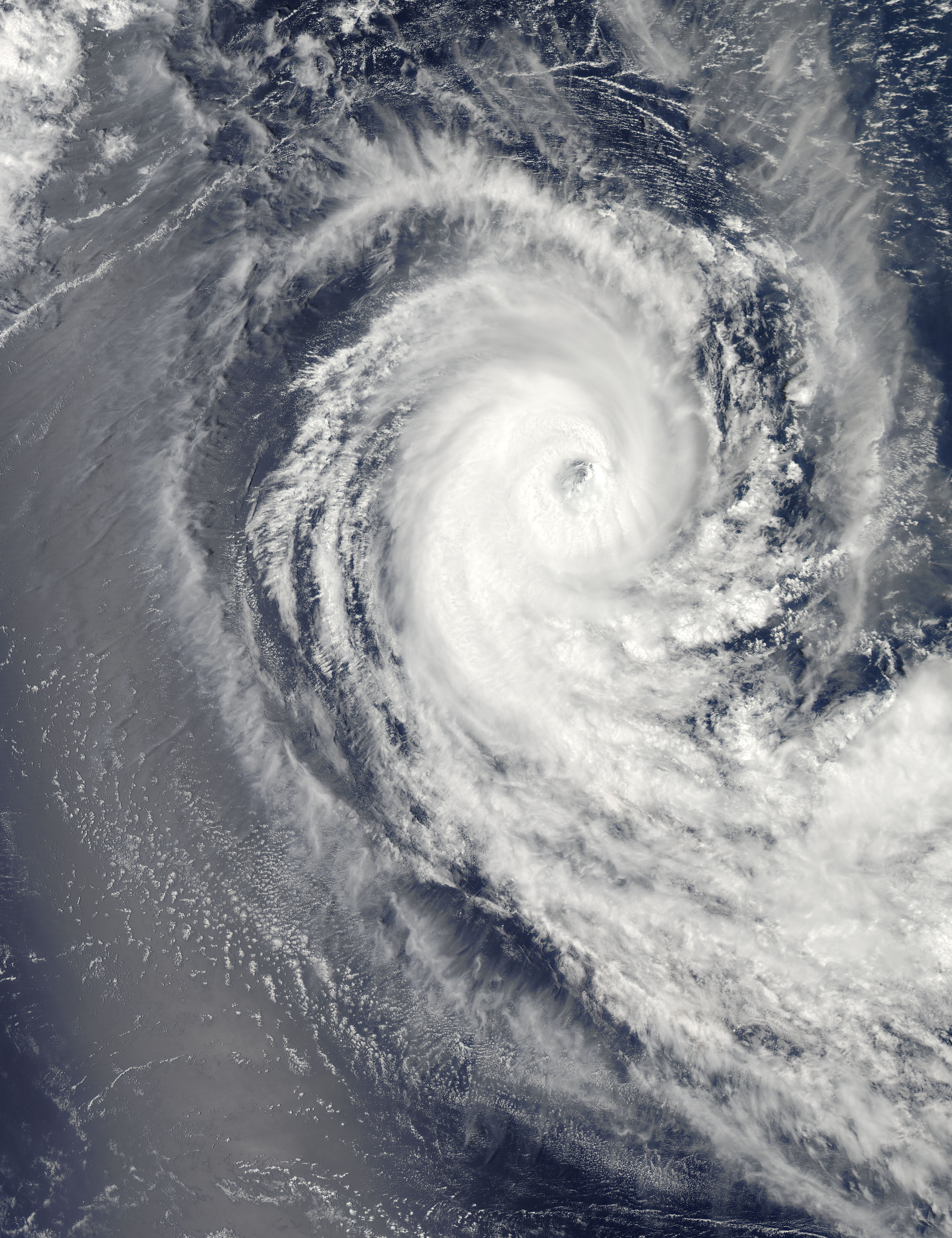
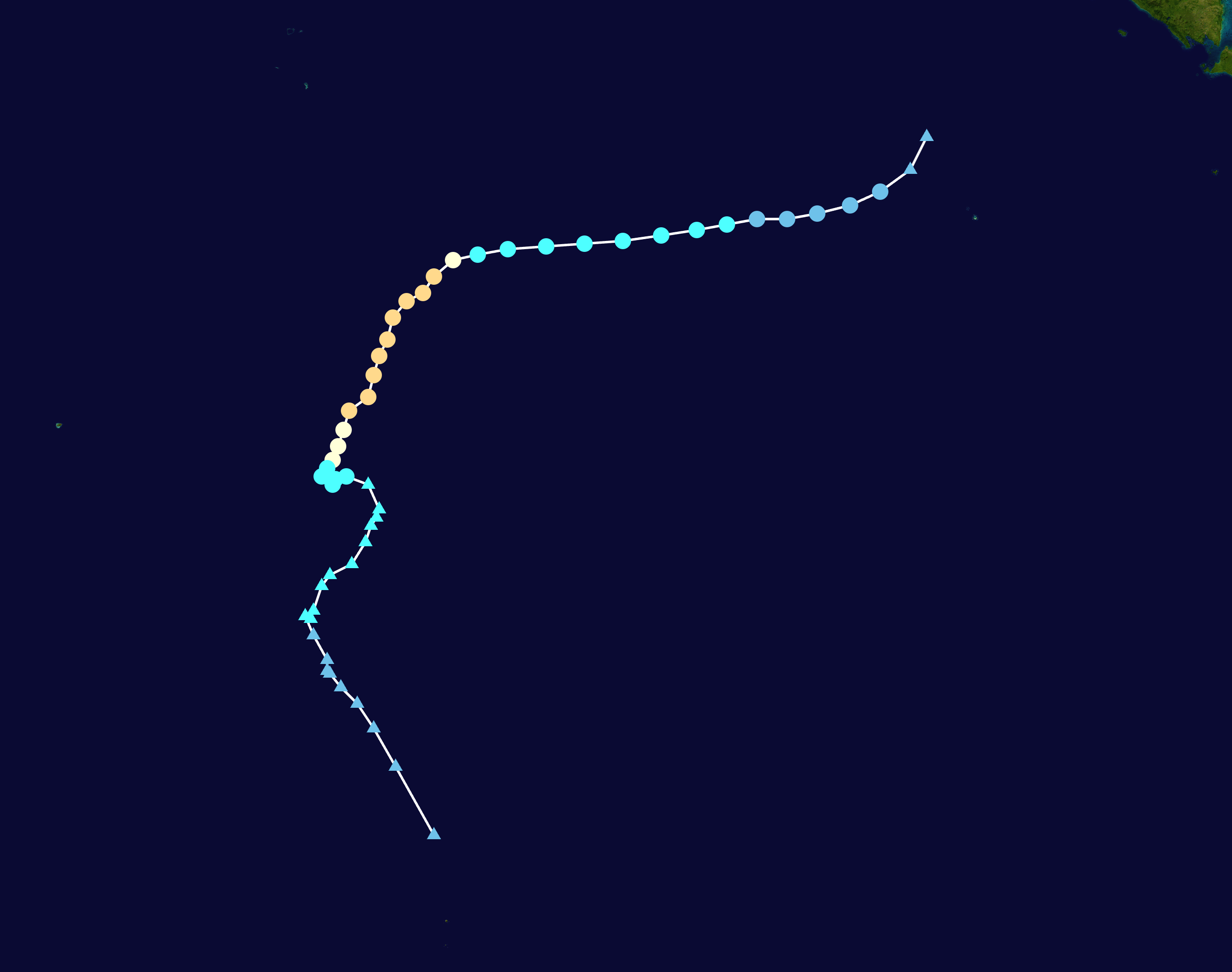
- Duration: December 28 (entered basin) – January 4
- Peak intensity: 150 km/h (90 mph) (10-min); 968 hPa (mbar)

On December 28, RSMC La Réunion reported that Tropical Disturbance 04 had moved into the region from the Australian region, where it had been monitored for about a week. During that day the disturbance gradually developed further which prompted the JTWC to start issuing advisories on the system and designate it as Tropical Cyclone 04S. On December 29, La Réunion upgraded the system to a moderate tropical storm, which was then named Benilde by Mauritius, a name contributed by Mozambique. Benilde moved in a general westward direction and quickly intensified into a tropical cyclone by December 31. The storm then took turned onto a more southwesterly path as it continued to strengthen. This period of continued strengthening did not last long. On January 1, dry air began to make its way into the southern area of the storm. Convection increased for a short period of time, but later in the day La Réunion noted that Benilde's northern eyewall had collapsed and the system was weakening after reporting 10-minute sustained peak wind speeds of 150 km/h (95 mph). On January 3, Benilde weakened into a Severe Tropical Storm. Suffering from severe wind shear, the system continued weakening and it became a tropical depression on January 4, while completely absorbing a weak disturbance to the north, late during that day. Early on January 5, Benilde weakened some more, as its northern structure collapsed completely, and the convection was displaced, to the south of the storm's center as it degenerated into an extratropical cyclone.

=== Moderate Tropical Storm Chanda ===
- Moderate tropical storm (MFR)
- Tropical storm (SSHWS)
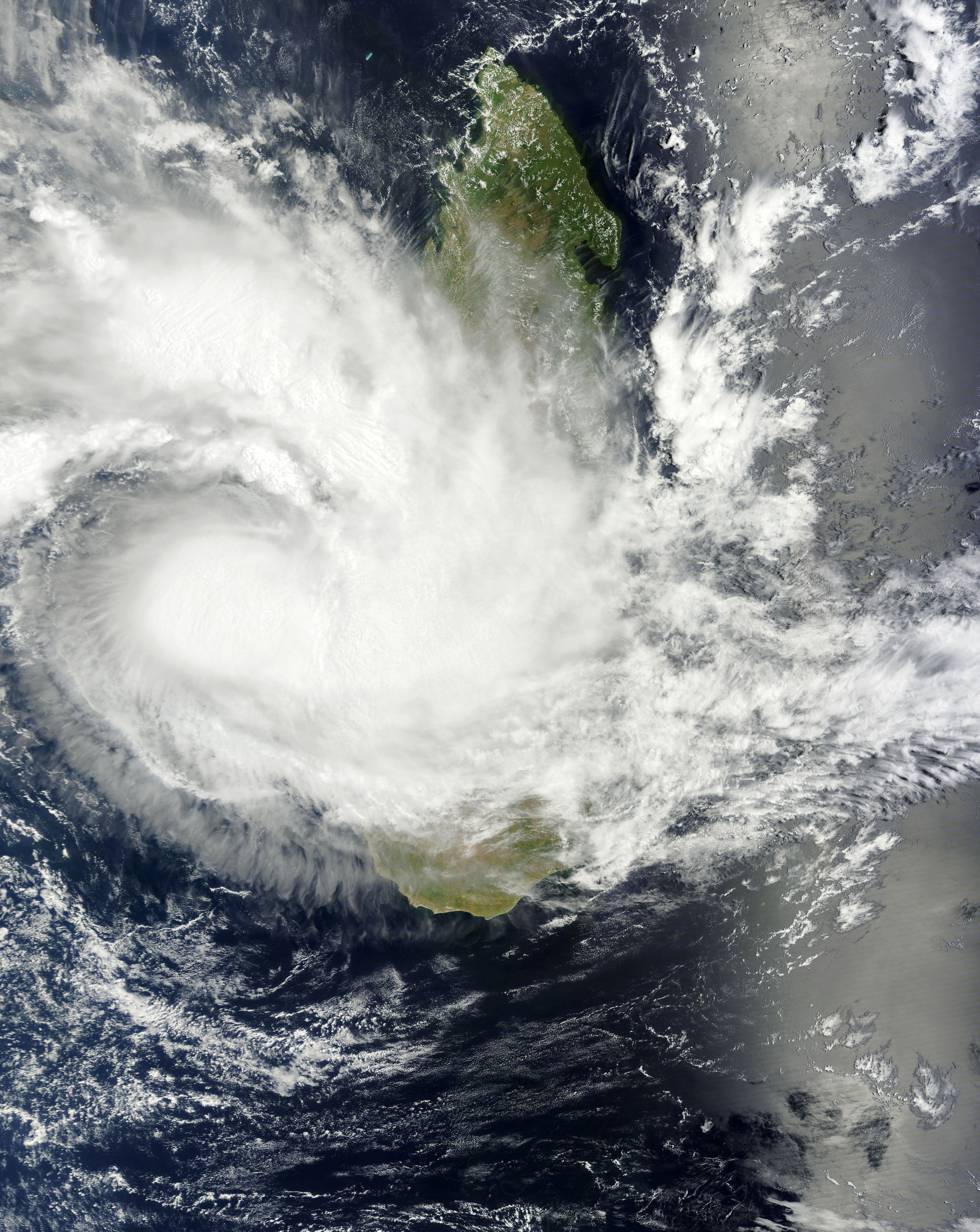
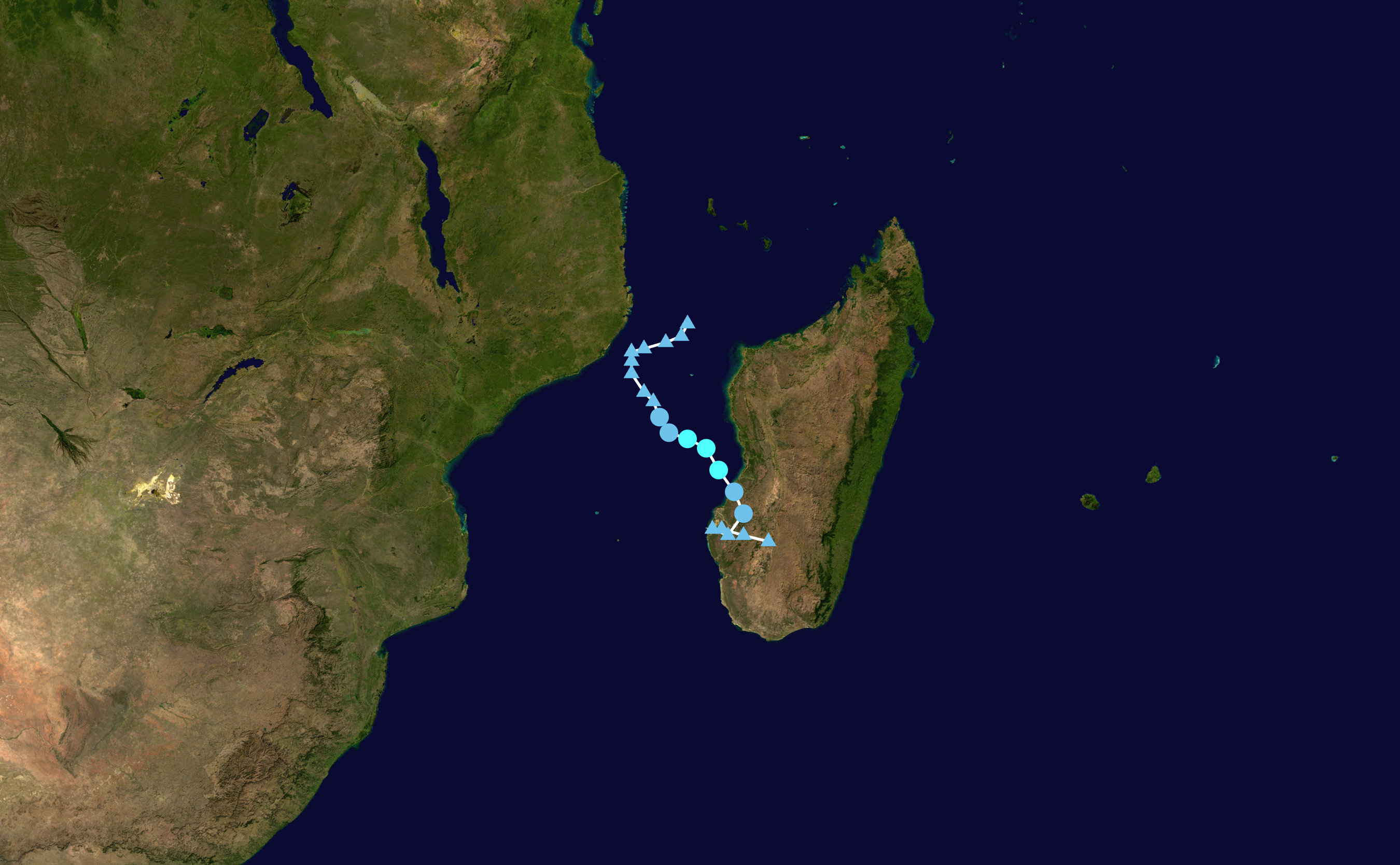
- Duration: January 5 – January 10
- Peak intensity: 75 km/h (45 mph) (10-min); 992 hPa (mbar)

On January 4, Météo-France noted an area of strong convective activity in the Mozambique Channel embedded within the Intertropical Convergence Zone and identified the genesis of a low level circulation near the coastline of Mozambique. The zone of disturbed weather persisted over the next several days and on the morning of January 8, Météo-France declared that a tropical disturbance had formed. Six hours later, the system was upgraded to a Tropical Depression as it drifted southeastwards towards Morondava, Madagascar, and after a further six hours it was named Moderate Tropical Storm Chanda, a name contributed by Mauritius. But after making landfall on Madagascar, late on January 8, Chanda began to weaken, as it moved further inland, towards Southern Madagascar. Early on January 10, Chanda emerged off the coast of southeastern Madagascar, and into the Indian Ocean. Chanda then slightly restrengthened, but soon began to weaken, as it encountered more wind shear. Early on January 11, Chanda's northern structure began to collapse, as it continued to move east-southeast slowly. Chanda soon transitioned into an extratropical cyclone, which prompted the last advisory on the storm to be issued.

Across Madagascar, Chanda produced heavy rains. In a 48‑hour period, 11 in (280 mm) of rain fell. Significant flooding in the country isolated several communities and inundated numerous homes. At least one person drowned in Miandrivazo.

=== Subtropical Depression Dando ===
- Subtropical depression (MFR)
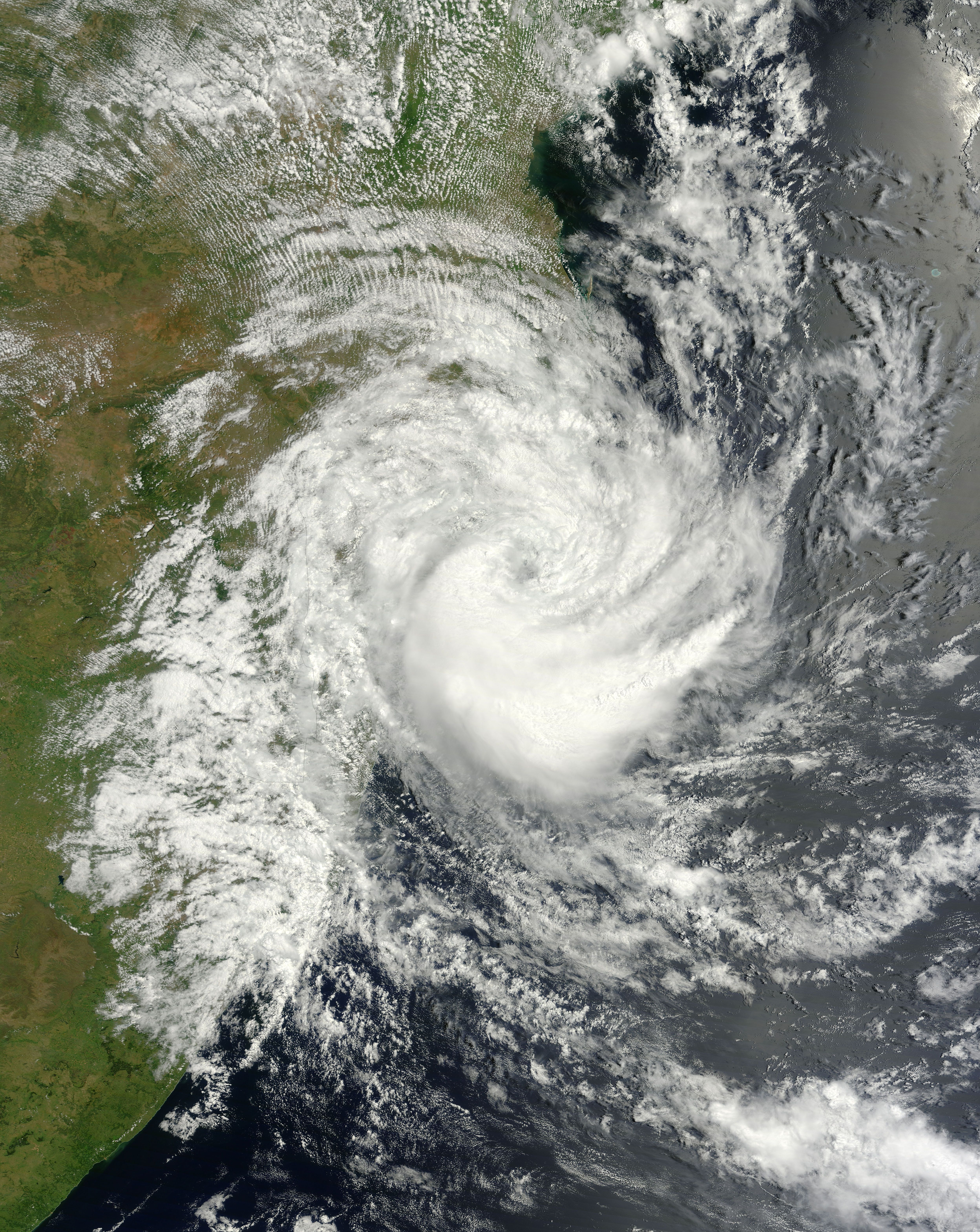
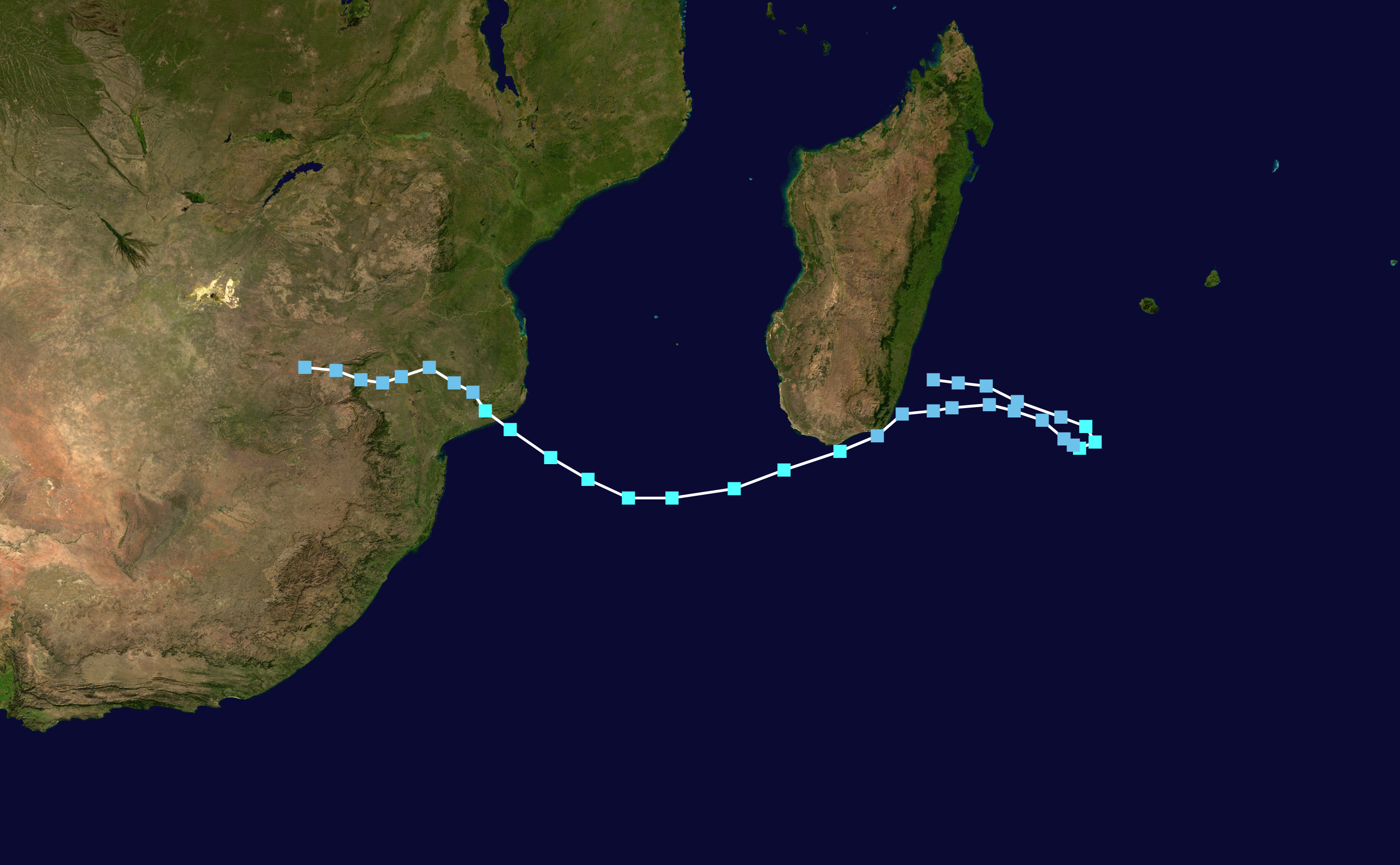
- Duration: January 10 – January 16
- Peak intensity: 85 km/h (50 mph) (10-min); 992 hPa (mbar)

An extratropical disturbance formed east of Madagascar on January 11, and transitioned into a subtropical depression the next day. It retained subtropical characteristics as it moved towards the African mainland, but by January 15, it reached the equivalent of cyclone strength and was allocated the name Dando by NWS Madagascar. The name was provided by Tanzania. On January 16, the last advisory was issued for Dando, as the system weakened to a remnant low. After making landfall on January 17, the remnants of Dando moved inland, before dissipating on January 18.

Dando was the first storm since Tropical Storm Domoina in 1984 to hit southern Mozambique. Heavy rains across southern parts of the country triggered significant flooding, prompting officials to urge residents in flood-prone areas to evacuate. Along the coast, waves up to 6 m (20 ft) prevented fishermen from leaving port. Rains from the storm also impacted parts of Zimbabwe and Swaziland. In Kruger National Park in South Africa hundreds of tourists and locals were left stranded and at least 30 people had to be airlifted after flash floods washed away bridges and damaged numerous buildings and roads in the area. The final death toll from the storm stood at 10, including six in South Africa's Mpumalanga province after heavy rains fueled by its remnants burst the banks of the Olifants River.

=== Severe Tropical Storm Ethel ===
- Severe tropical storm (MFR)
- Category 1 tropical cyclone (SSHWS)
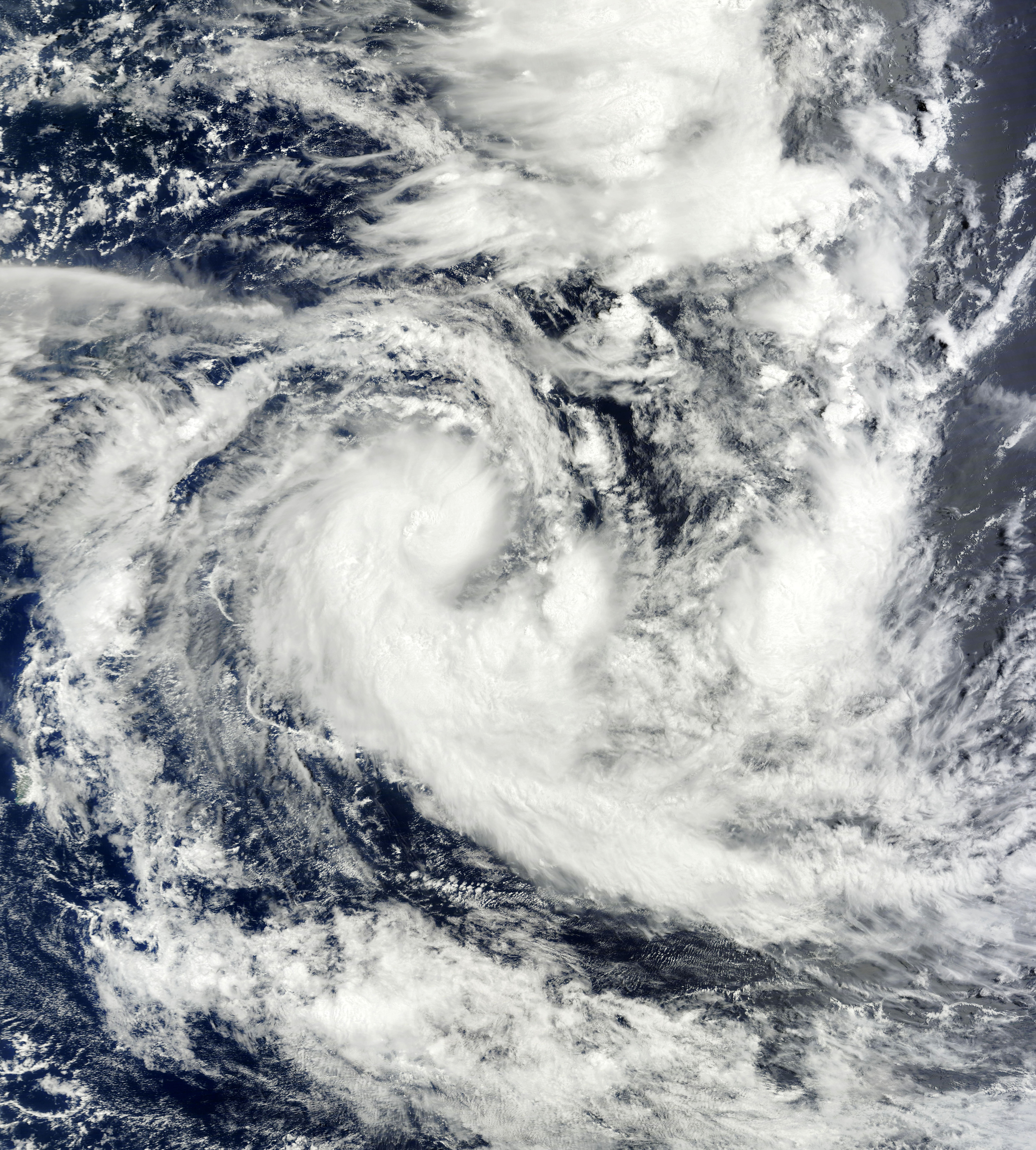
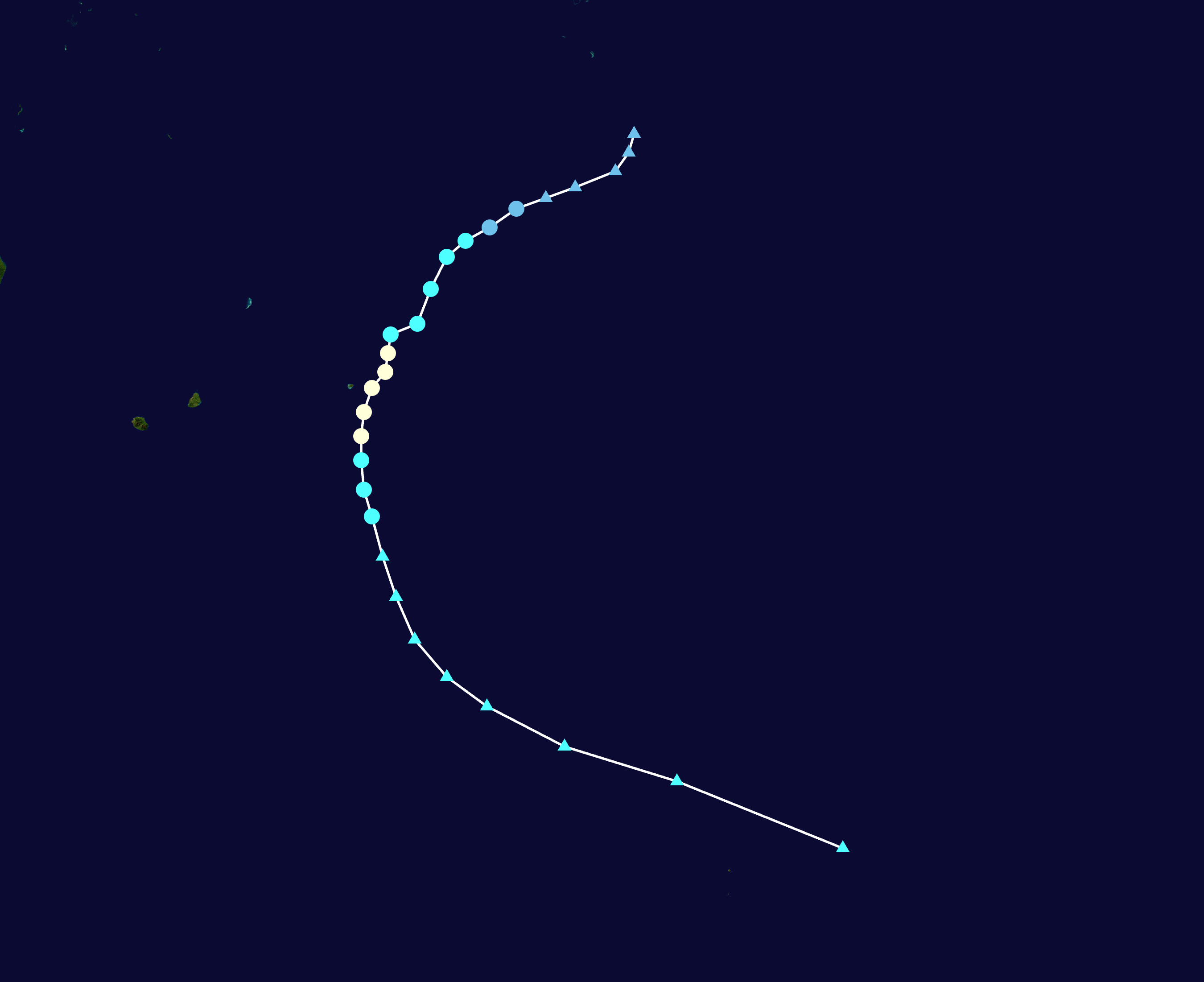
- Duration: January 17 – January 22
- Peak intensity: 100 km/h (65 mph) (10-min); 972 hPa (mbar)

On January 18, RSMC La Réunion started to monitor a tropical disturbance that had developed to the northeast of Rodrigues. During that day the disturbance gradually developed further before during the next day it was named as Ethel by the Mauritius Meteorological Service as it reached tropical storm strength. Late on January 19, Ethel intensified into a severe tropical storm, and continued to intensify into a category 1 equivalent tropical cyclone, on January 20,. Cool sea surface temperatures and not very favorable wind shear made Ethel unable to intensify further, with the system weakening back to a Moderate Tropical Storm on January 22,. Soon, convection was displaced, to the south of the storm's center, as it degenerated into an extratropical cyclone, on January 23,. As a result, the JTWC issued their last warning on the system.

Passing near Rodrigues, the storm produced high winds and heavy rains across the island. In a 24‑hour span, 174 mm (6.9 in) of rain fell on the island. Significant damage was reported on the island and communication was disrupted. Injuries were also reported in the wake of the storm. One person died from electrocution in an event related to the cyclone.

=== Intense Tropical Cyclone Funso ===
- Intense tropical cyclone (MFR)
- Category 4 tropical cyclone (SSHWS)
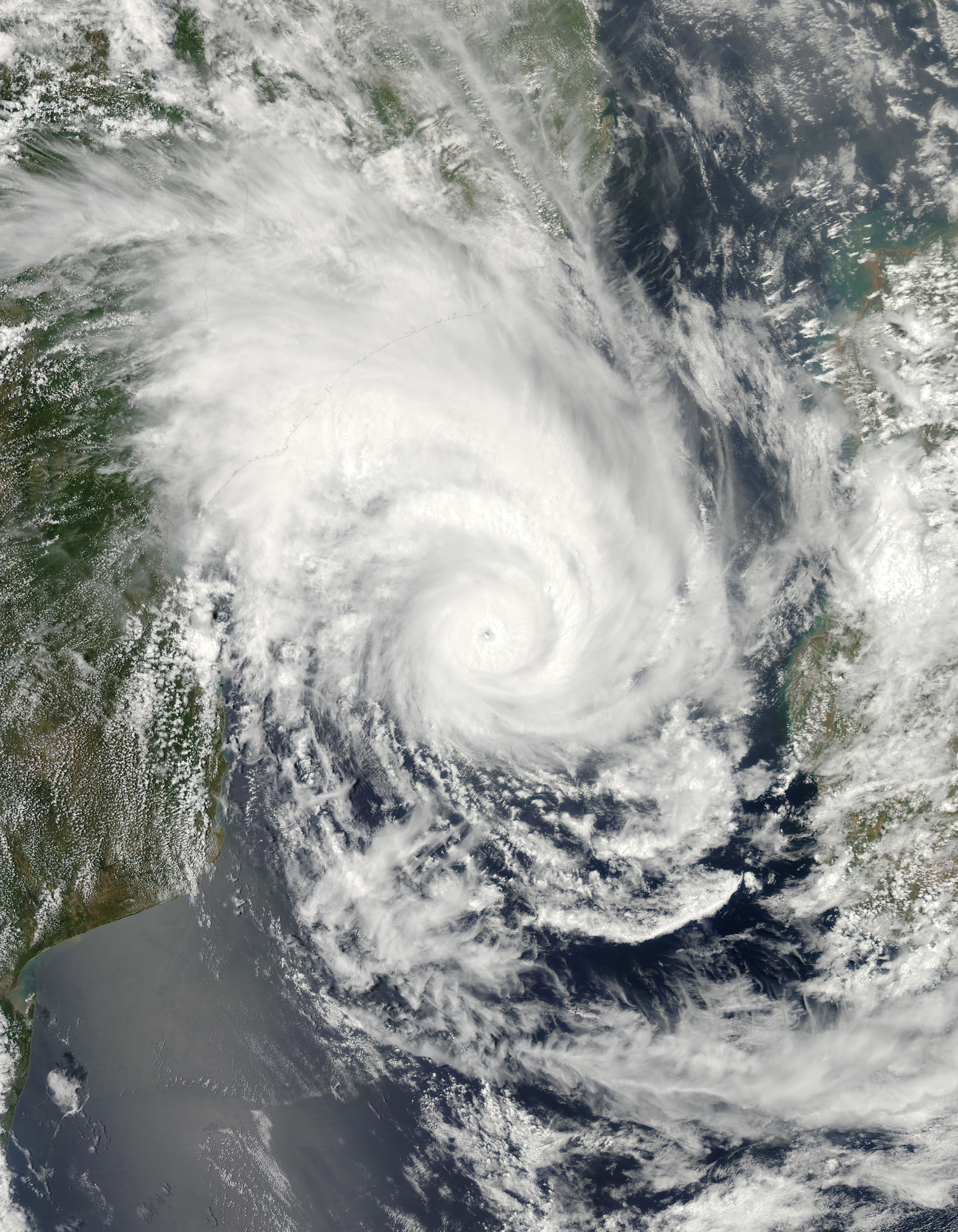
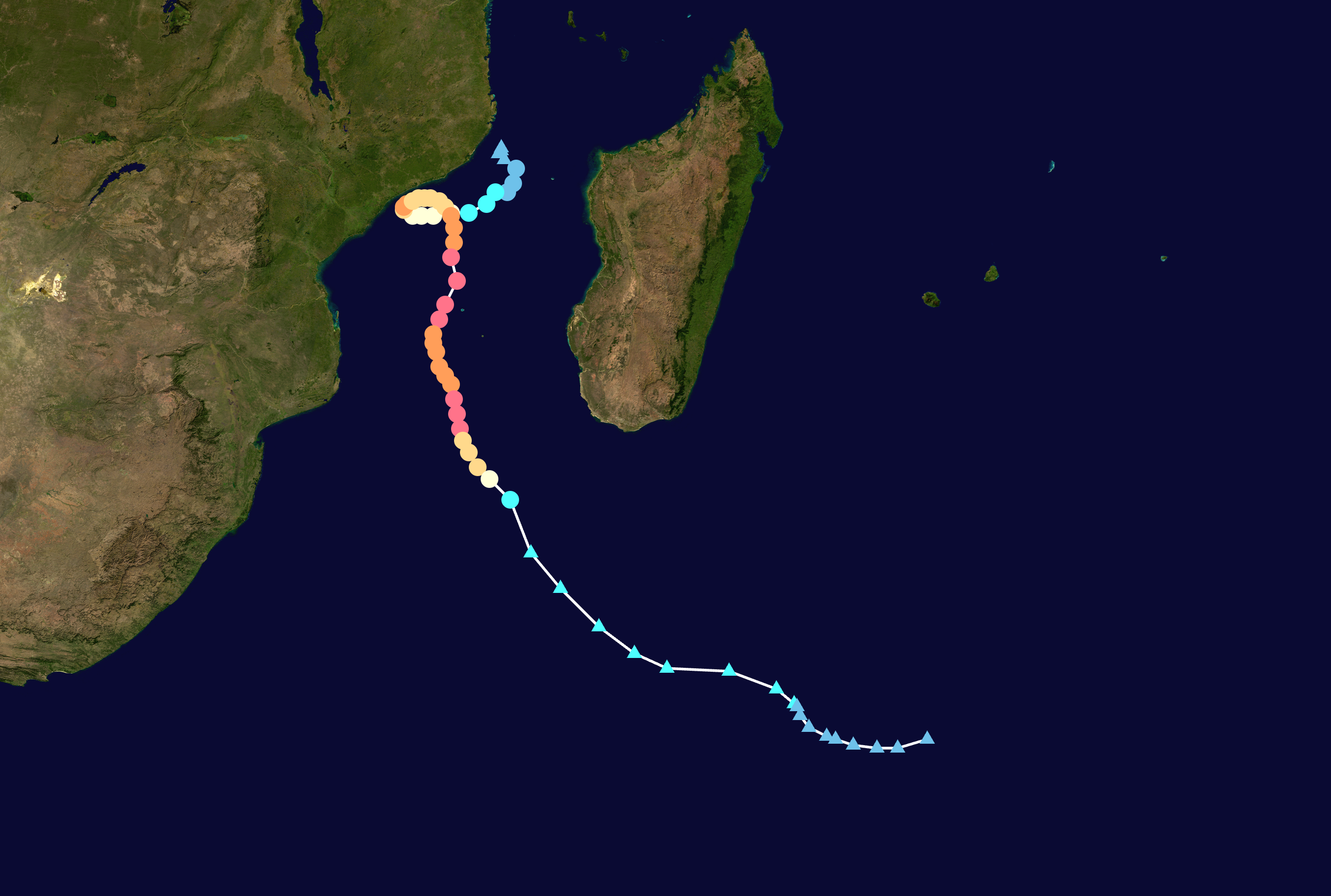
- Duration: January 17 – January 28
- Peak intensity: 205 km/h (125 mph) (10-min); 925 hPa (mbar)

On January 17, RSMC La Réunion started to monitor an area of low pressure that had developed within the Mozambique Channel about 620 km (365 mi) to the northwest of Antananarivo, Madagascar. Over the next two days the area of low pressure rapidly developed further in an area of favourable conditions.

During the overnight hours of January 18, a ship carrying 54 people sank on its way from Anjouan to Mayotte amidst rough seas produced by Funso. At least 15 passengers drowned while dozens remain missing. The Mpumalanga and Limpopo regions of South Africa, which were hit by flooding from Dando, was at risk of further flooding and waterborne diseases by January 20.

Early on January 19, RSMC La Réunion declared the disturbance Tropical Depression 08, shortly before the JTWC also initiated advisories and declared the depression "Tropical Cyclone 08S" as it became equivalent to a tropical storm. Later that day the Malagasy national weather service named the storm Funso before early the next day as it continued to intensify quickly, RSMC La Réunion declared that Funso had intensified into a tropical cyclone. Due to land interaction, Funso weakened slightly on January 22–23, but soon reintensified into an intense tropical cyclone as it started heading south. Although the core of the storm remained offshore, over three million people were affected by tropical storm-force winds. Funso strengthened a little more on January 24, as it continued to move southward slowly. However, early on January 25, Funso began to weaken, due to an eyewall replacement cycle. remarked that Funso weakened below intense tropical cyclone intensity early on January 25. At the same time, the JTWC estimated the cyclone intensified further to peak 1 minute sustained winds of 220 km/h (135 mph), based on estimates via the Dvorak technique. The agency noted that the eyewall replacement cycle finished and produced a well-defined eye 28 km (17 mi) in diameter. At 1200 UTC on January 25, MF again upgraded Funso to an intense tropical cyclone, and later that day, the cyclone began another eyewall replacement cycle, and started to develop a larger eye, measuring 55 km across. On January 27, Funson underwent yet another eyewall replacement cycle on January 27, as it started weakening. On the next day, Funso became extratropical, due to strong wind shear and colder waters. For the next few days, Funso's remnants moved eastward, before dissipating on February 1.

On January 23, national television in Mozambique announced 12 deaths in the northern Zambezia Province, following the intense cyclone's passage close to land. Seven of the fatalities occurred in the Maganja da Costa District and one was in the provincial capital Quelimane. More than 5000 people were displaced by the weather conditions and the only road connecting the capital Maputo to the north was reported to be seriously damaged when the Komati River flooded its banks, cutting off the capital city. At least 70,000 people were without a clean drinking water supply following the storm, and more than 56,000 were left homeless in Mozambique.

Authorities in Malawi were concerned about the fate of more than 450 families that lost their homes in the southern Nsanje District due to the effects of Funso, which mostly affected Bangula and Phokela, as three rivers overflowed. Heavy rains destroyed more than 320 houses and flooded 125 more and local crops were devastated, leaving whole communities at risk of starvation.

On January 24, the death toll in Mozambique jumped to at least 25, as government officials were trying to reach the hardest-hit areas in the northern Zambezia province. Authorities confirmed that they expected the numbers to rise even further.

=== Intense Tropical Cyclone Giovanna ===
- Intense tropical cyclone (MFR)
- Category 4 tropical cyclone (SSHWS)
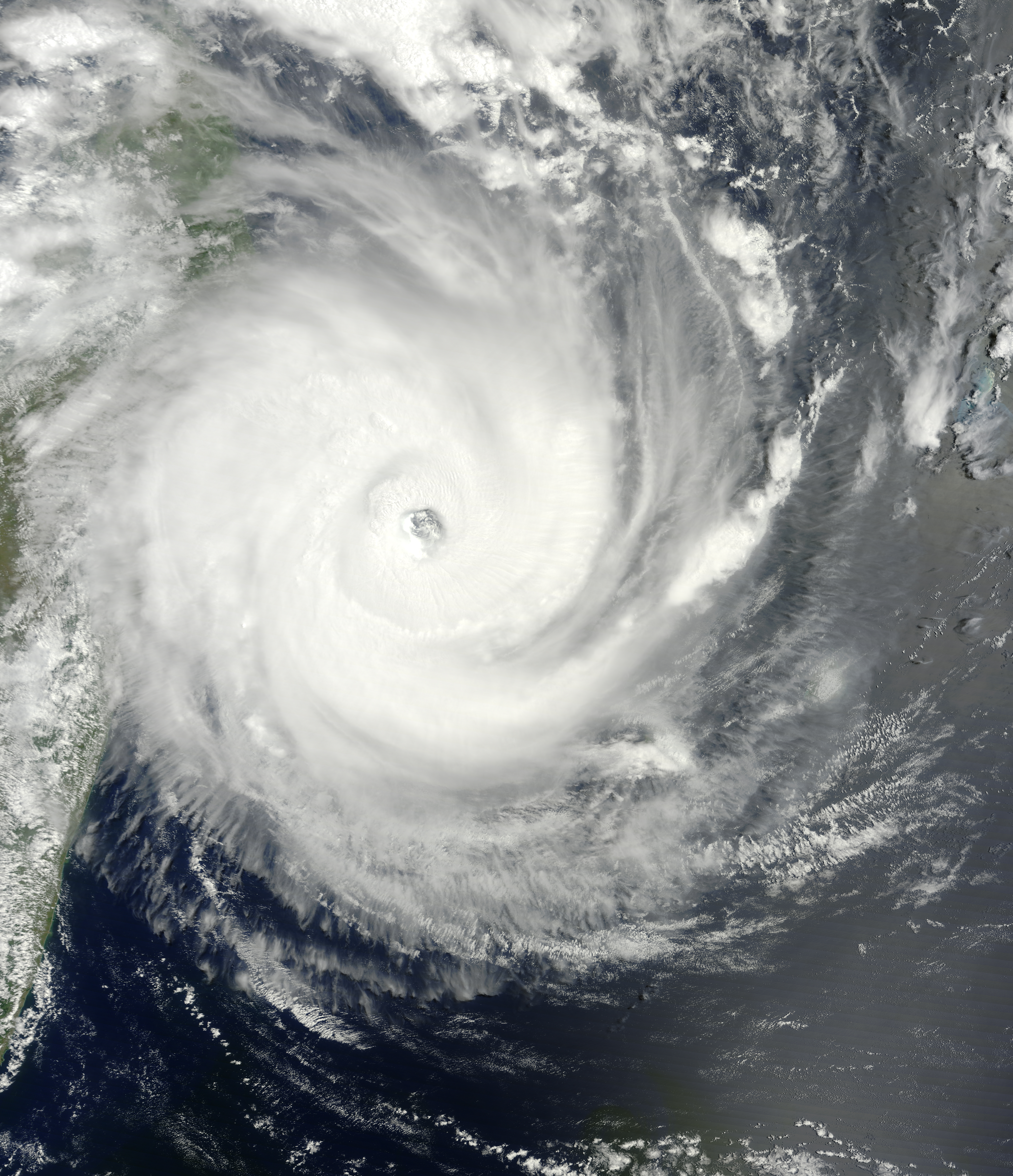
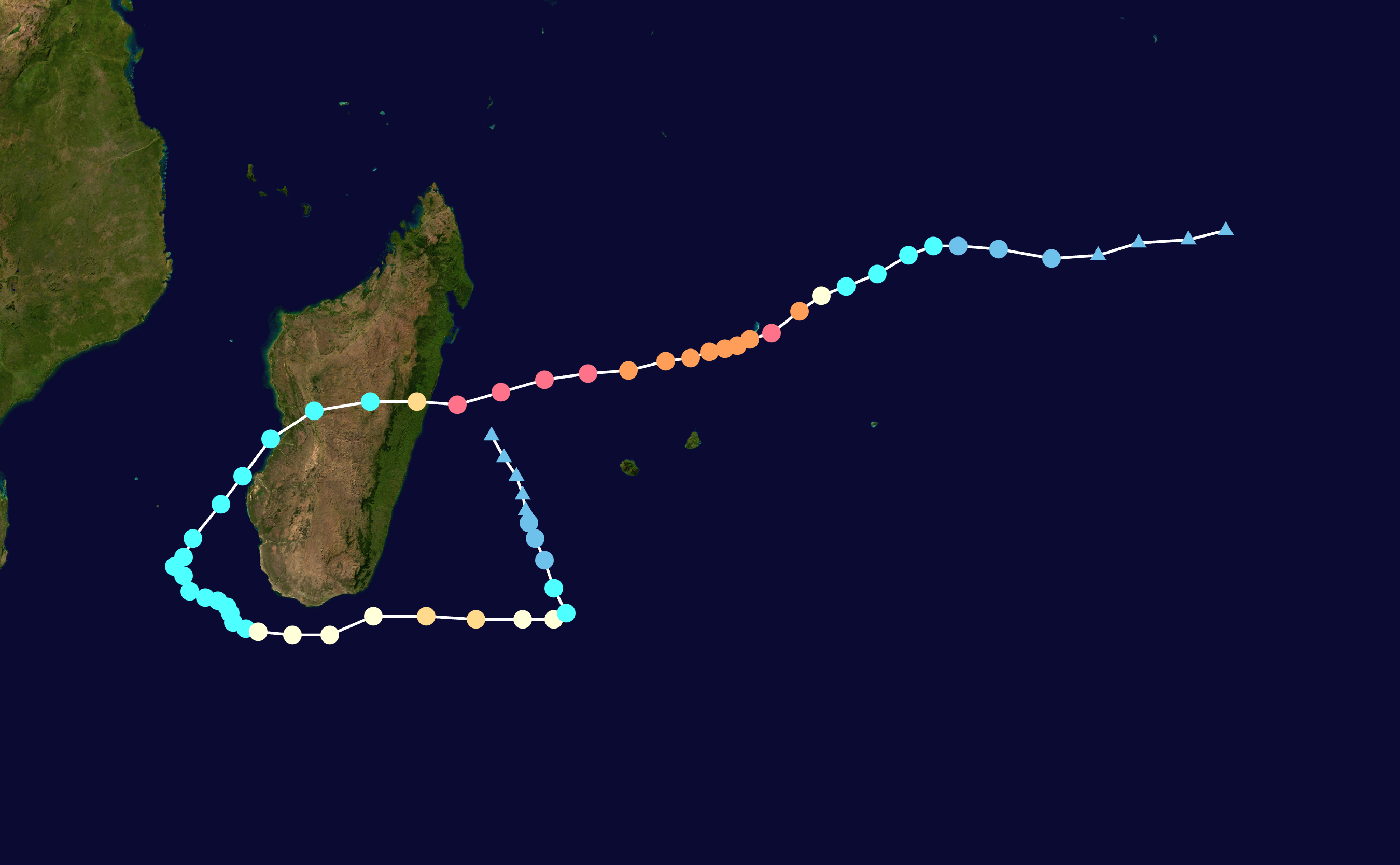
- Duration: February 7 – February 22
- Peak intensity: 195 km/h (120 mph) (10-min); 935 hPa (mbar)

On February 7, a tropical disturbance formed in the South Indian Ocean. On February 9, RSMC La Réunion reported that the disturbance has strengthened into Tropical Depression 09 and was located south-southwest of Diego Garcia. On the same day, the JTWC upgraded it to a tropical storm designating as 12S, and the storm intensified into a moderate tropical storm named Giovanna later. On February 10, Giovanna continued strengthening into a severe tropical storm. Late on the same day, Giovanna went through explosive intensification and became an intense tropical cyclone. Soon, Giovanna began an eyewall replacement cycle and weakened into a tropical cyclone on February 11,. However, the wind shear surrounding Giovanna weakened, so Giovanna was able to strengthen back into an intense tropical cyclone with a larger eye on February 13,. At about 22:00Z on February 13, Giovanna made landfall near Andovoranto in Madagascar, and it rapidly weakened into an overland depression on February 14. Early on February 15, Giovanna moved off the western coast of Madagascar and into the Mozambique Channel, as the storm gradually began to reorganize. Over the next few days, Giovanna curved around the southern part of Madagascar, due to a strong anticyclone over the area. On February 18, as Giovanna moved eastwards, along the bottom of Madagascar, the storm was steered into warmer waters, where it strengthened into a Category 2 tropical cyclone again, and developed a small eye. However the new eye soon underwent an eyewall replacement cycle, and developed double eyewalls, due to moderate wind shear. On February 20, Giovanna entered an area of strong vertical wind shear, which quickly weakened the system into a tropical depression, and displaced the system's convection to south of the system's exposed circulation center. This caused Giovanna to degenerate into a remnant low on February 22, with the low level circulation center totally later that next day. The exposed remnants were soon pushed further northwestward the next day, due to a Fujiwhara interaction between a stronger system to the east, Moderate Tropical Storm Hilwa. On February 24, Giovanna's remnants dissipated to the east of Madagascar.

Large waves estimated up to 8 m (26 ft) affected the coast of Reunion and resulted in one fatality after a man was swept out to sea. Another fatality took place in Mauritius after a man lost control of his motorcycle during poor weather and crashed into an electricity pylon. In total, the storm killed at least 35 people across the region.

=== Moderate Tropical Storm Hilwa ===
- Moderate tropical storm (MFR)
- Tropical storm (SSHWS)
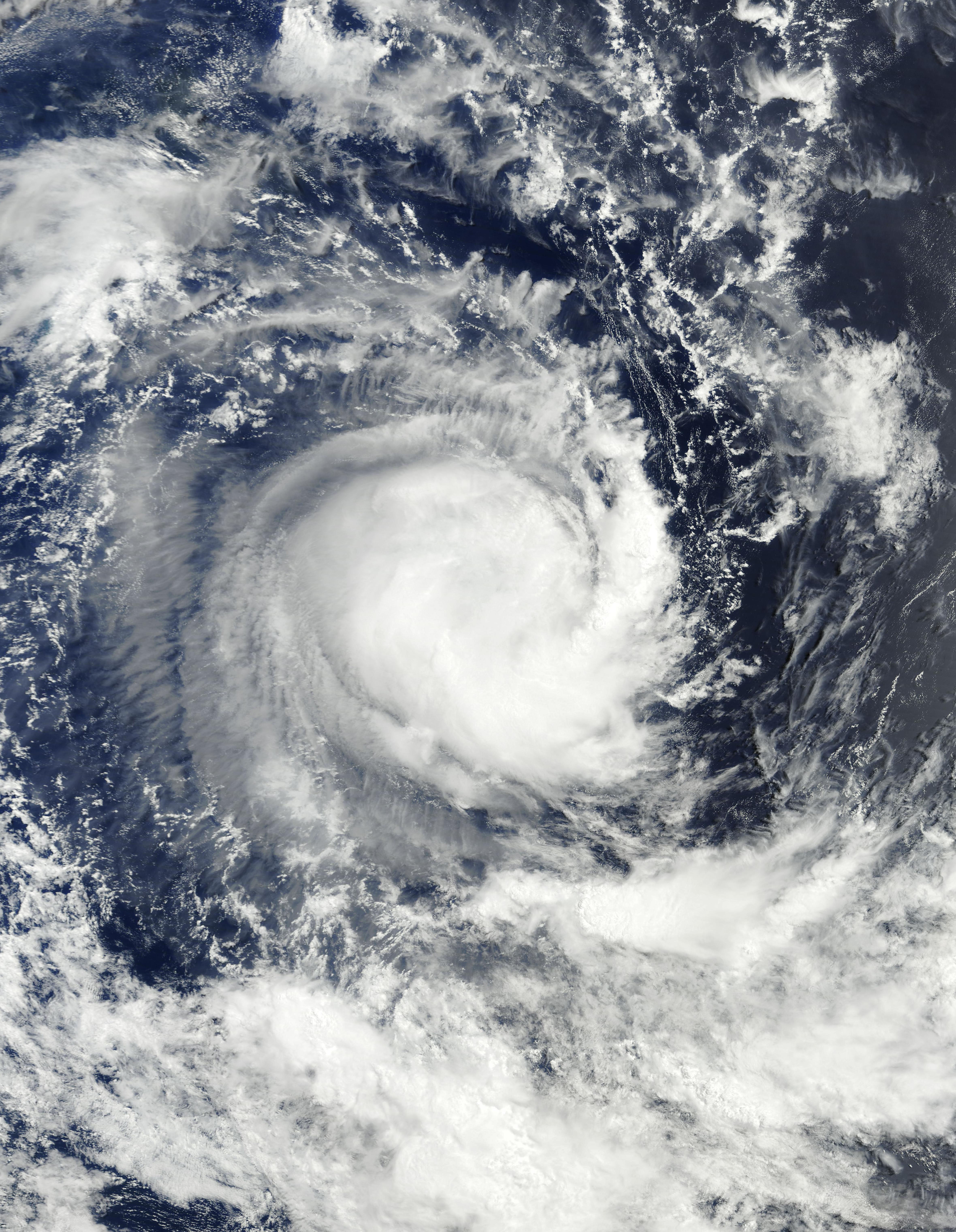
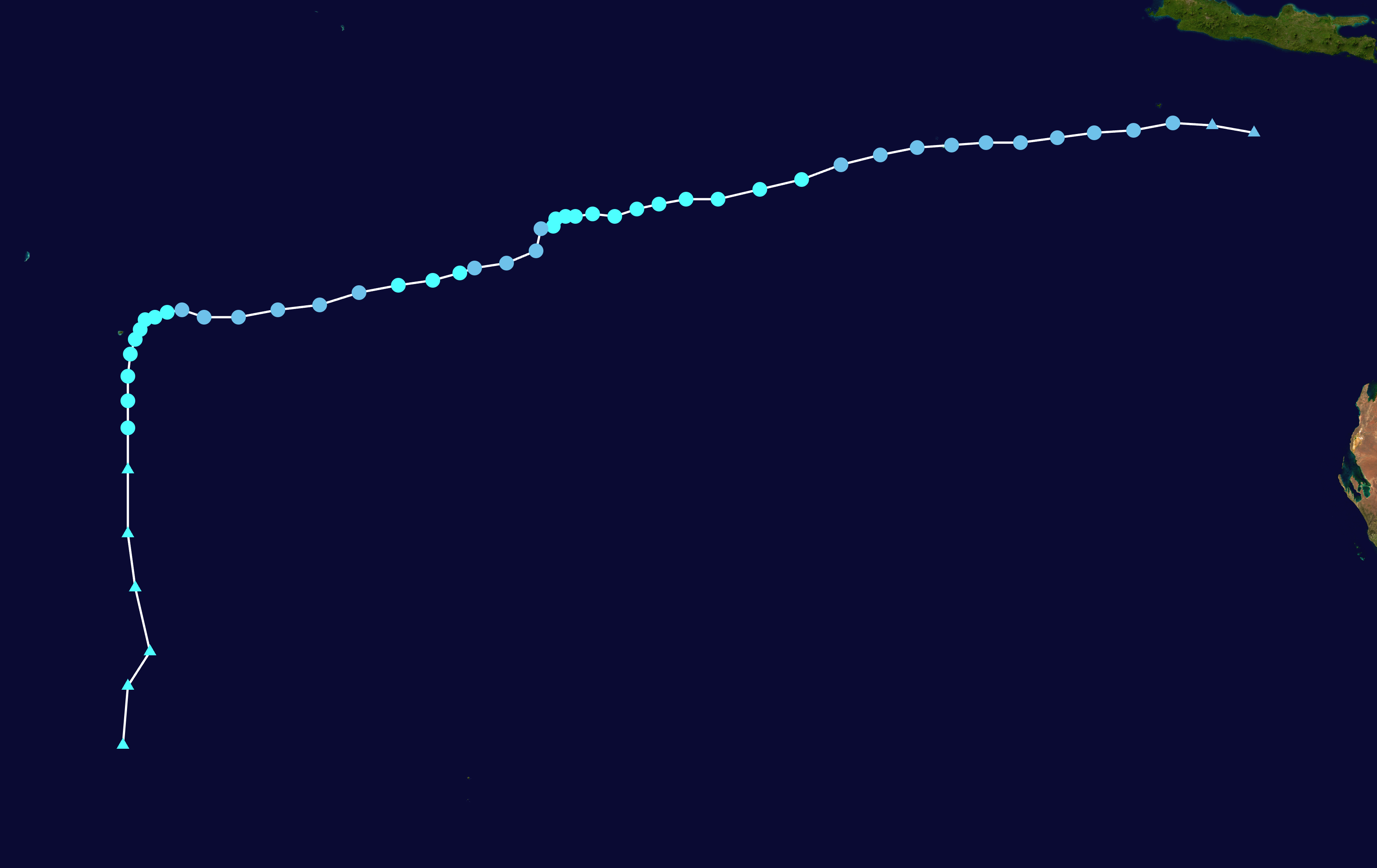
- Duration: February 14 (entered basin) – February 22
- Peak intensity: 75 km/h (45 mph) (10-min); 993 hPa (mbar)

On February 5, a small patch of thunderstorms that formed off the southern coast of Java grouped together to form a low-pressure area which quickly started to drift westwards. On the same day, TCWC Perth upgraded the area of low pressure into a tropical low. As the storm continued to move westward, it gradually organized. On February 14, the storm moved out of the BoM's basin and into the South-West Indian Ocean. On the same day, RSMC La Réunion reported that the low had become a tropical depression, which was then located east-southeast of Diego Garcia. Later on the same day, the JTWC upgraded the storm into a tropical storm and designated it as 13S. However, on February 15, the depression gradually weakened due to increased wind shear. But on February 17, the storm began to reorganize. On the next day, the storm quickly organized itself, as it turned towards the southwest. On February 20, the storm strengthened into a Moderate Tropical Storm and was given the name Hilwa. Later on that same day, Hilwa turned southwards as wind shear caused the system to weaken again. Late on February 22, Hilwa's northwestern structure was completely sheared as the storm rapidly degenerated into an extratropical cyclone. At 0000 UTC on February 23, Hilwa completed its transition into an extratropical cyclone and the final advisory for the storm was issued several hours later.

=== Severe Tropical Storm Irina ===
- Severe tropical storm (MFR)
- Tropical storm (SSHWS)
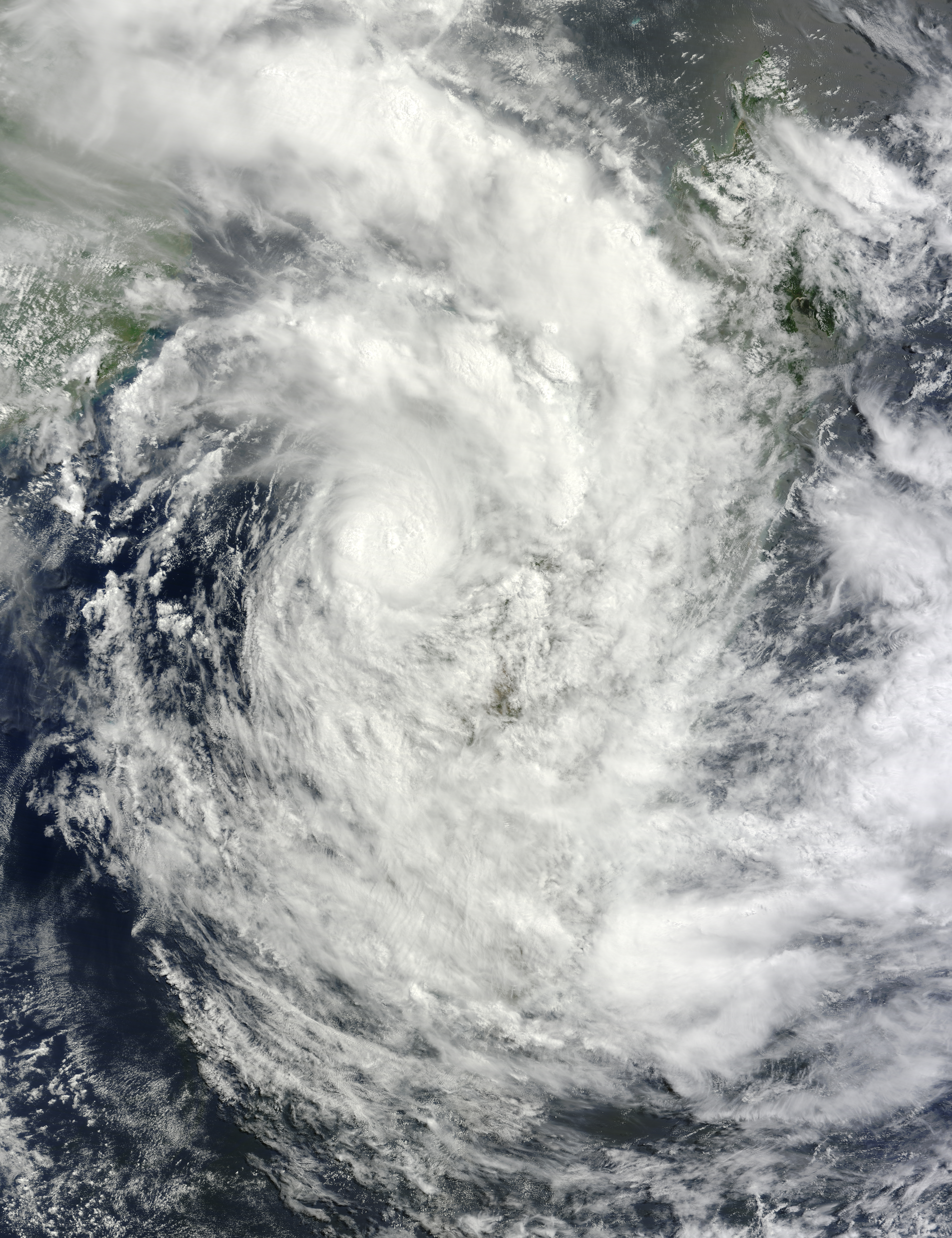
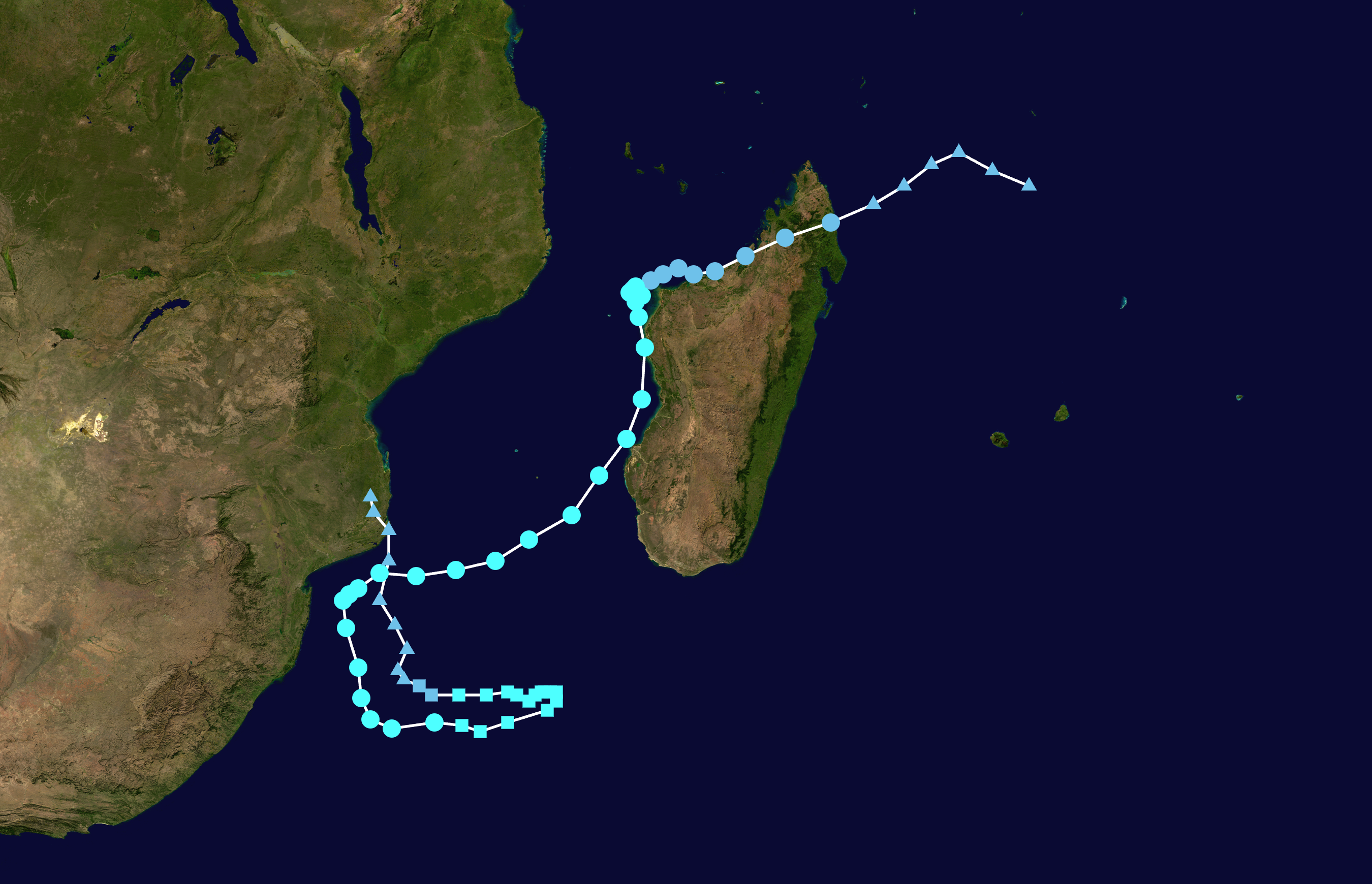
- Duration: February 25 – March 12
- Peak intensity: 95 km/h (60 mph) (10-min); 978 hPa (mbar)

On February 22, an area of disturbed weather formed in the South-West Indian Ocean. The system steadily strengthened into a low-pressure area shortly afterwards. With favorable conditions, ample convection was able to wrap around the low level circulation center, which allowed the system to strengthen into a tropical depression, on February 25,. On February 26, RSMC La Réunion upgraded the system to Moderate Tropical Storm Irina as it continued to intensify. However, Irina made landfall on Northern Madagascar a few hours later and weakened into an overland depression. On February 27, Irina emerged off the northwestern coast of Madagascar. Within the next several hours, Irina was able to strengthen slightly, as the storm moved very close along the coast of Madagascar. Later on the same day, Irina made landfall a second time on Madagascar, this time at Northwest Madagascar. Late on February 27, Irina weakened into a Zone of Disturbed Weather, while it was overland. Early on February 28, Irina emerged off the western coast of Madagascar. Later on the same day, Irina regained tropical depression intensity, and slowly began to reorganize. However, for the next day, Irina was unable to regain Moderate Tropical Storm intensity, because of poor organization, and because the storm's low level circulation center was displaced, well to the east of the storm's convection. Early on February 29, Irina was able to reorganize sufficiently, and regained Moderate Tropical Storm status. Just a few hours later, the JTWC designated Irina as Tropical Cyclone 12S. As Irina continued to organize, the storm gradually began to strengthen, as it turned southward, along the western coast of Madagascar. On March 1, Irina intensified into a Severe Tropical Storm, as it moved towards Western Madagascar. Late on that same day, Irina reached its peak intensity, with a minimum low pressure of 979 mbars. Early on March 5, Irina weakened into a Moderate Tropical Storm.

The system then made a small loop off the coasts of Mozambique and South Africa before starting to head in a northwestern direction towards Madagascar yet again due to weak steering conditions. The official death toll as of March 6, stood at 77, including at least 65 dead in the island nation, most of them in the southeastern Ifanadiana district. Five fishermen were killed of the Mozambique coast and at least 3 more people in the south of the country when a tree fell on their roof and collapsed it. South Africa reported four fatalities as waves of up to 3 m battered the port of Durban and forced all ships to seek safety. Irina is the deadliest storm of the season so far, and took the total death toll of the 2011–12 season to 164, the highest since the 2006–07 season. Later on March 6, wind shear began taking its toll on the system, and much of the storm's convection in the outer rain band were eroded away. As the storm continued to move towards Southern Madagascar, the wind shear removed more of the storm's convection, even as the storm continued to weaken. On March 7, Irina began to stall. Early on March 8, only a small amount of convection remained, which was wrapped around the center of circulation. Early on March 9, Irina's eye disappeared, as the storm continued to weaken. As the storm turned back towards South Africa, it lost its organization, due to the strong wind shear. Early on March 10, RSMC Reunion issued their last advisory on Irina, as the storm degenerated into a remnant low. Over the next 2 days, Irina's remnant low continued to drift northwestwards. On March 12, Irina's remnants made landfall over the Gaza Province, and dissipated.

=== Tropical Depression 12 ===
- Tropical depression (MFR)
- Tropical storm (SSHWS)
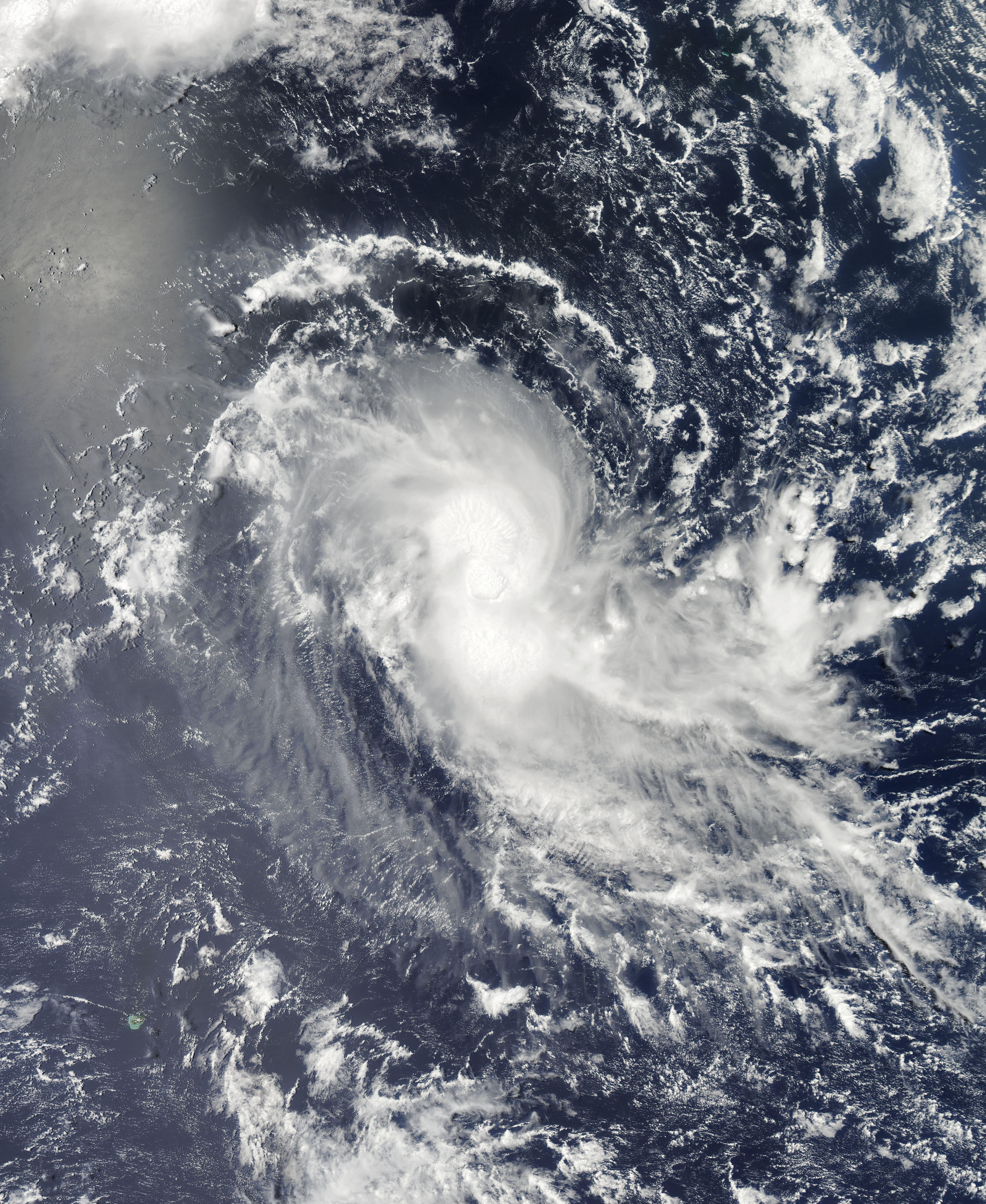
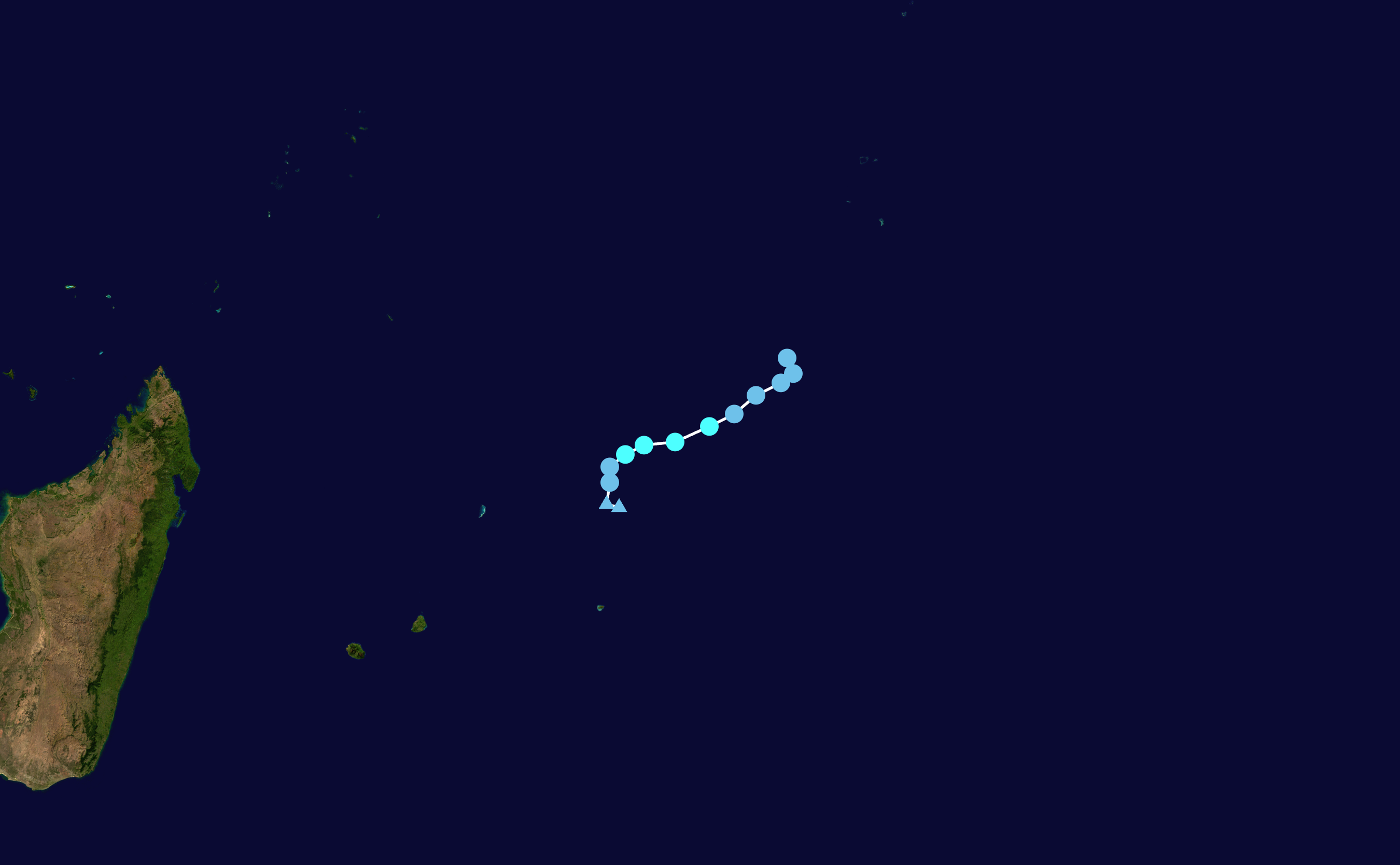
- Duration: February 29 – March 3
- Peak intensity: 55 km/h (35 mph) (10-min); 996 hPa (mbar)

On February 23, an area of low pressure formed over the middle of the South Indian Ocean. Over the next several days, the low slowly drifted westwards while gradually organizing. Early on February 29, RSMC La Réunion upgraded to storm to a tropical disturbance as the storm organized significantly. Six hours later, the storm was upgraded to a tropical depression, as it continued to organize. Late on February 29, the JTWC designated the system as Tropical Cyclone 15S. Several hours later, Tropical Depression 12 began to weaken as the storm began encountering wind shear. On March 3, the storm executed a cyclonic loop, before turning towards the east. Late on the same day, the storm weakened into a remnant low, before degenerating into a weak extratropical cyclone shortly afterwards.

=== Severe Tropical Storm Koji–Joni ===
- Severe tropical storm (MFR)
- Category 1 tropical cyclone (SSHWS)
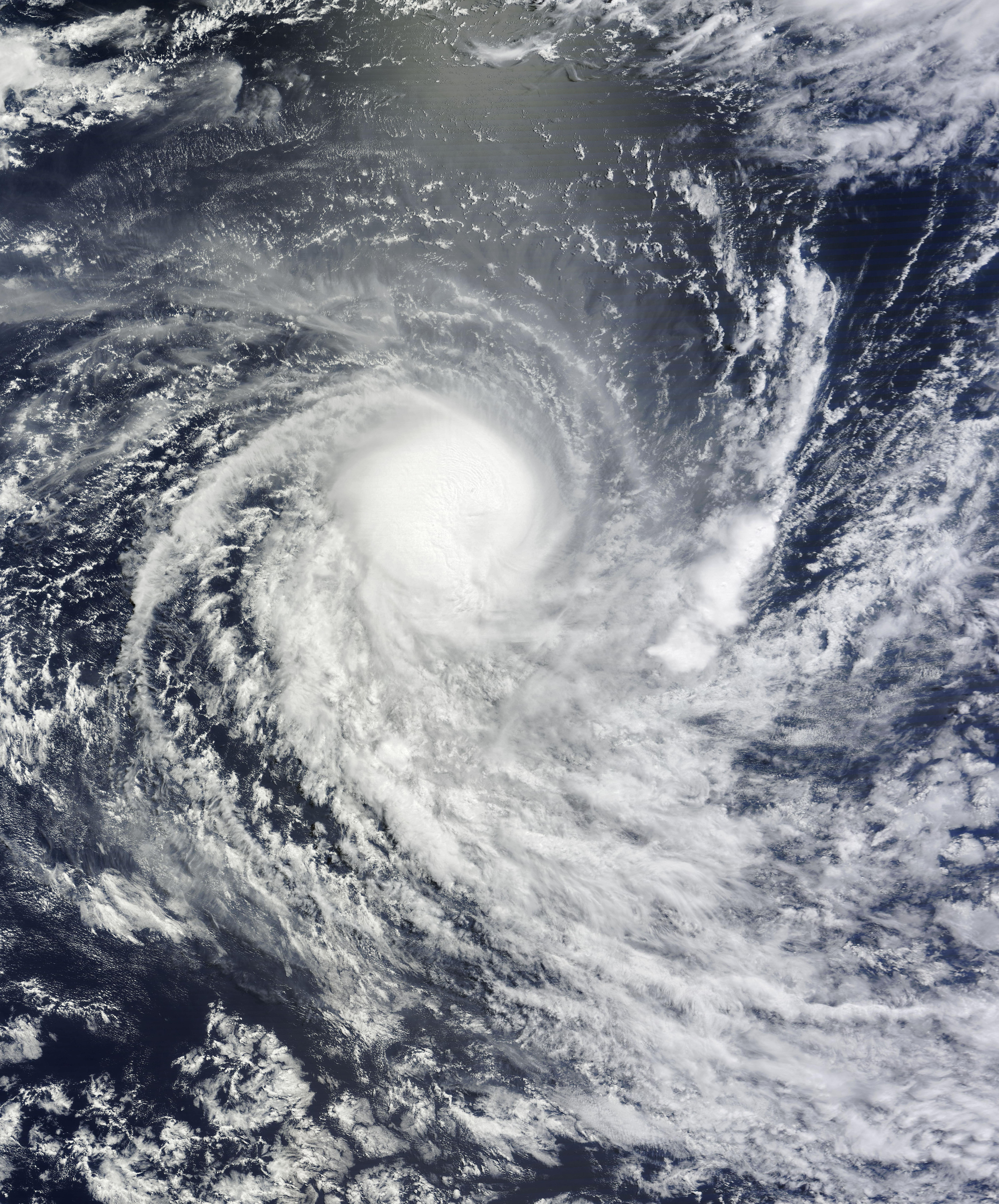
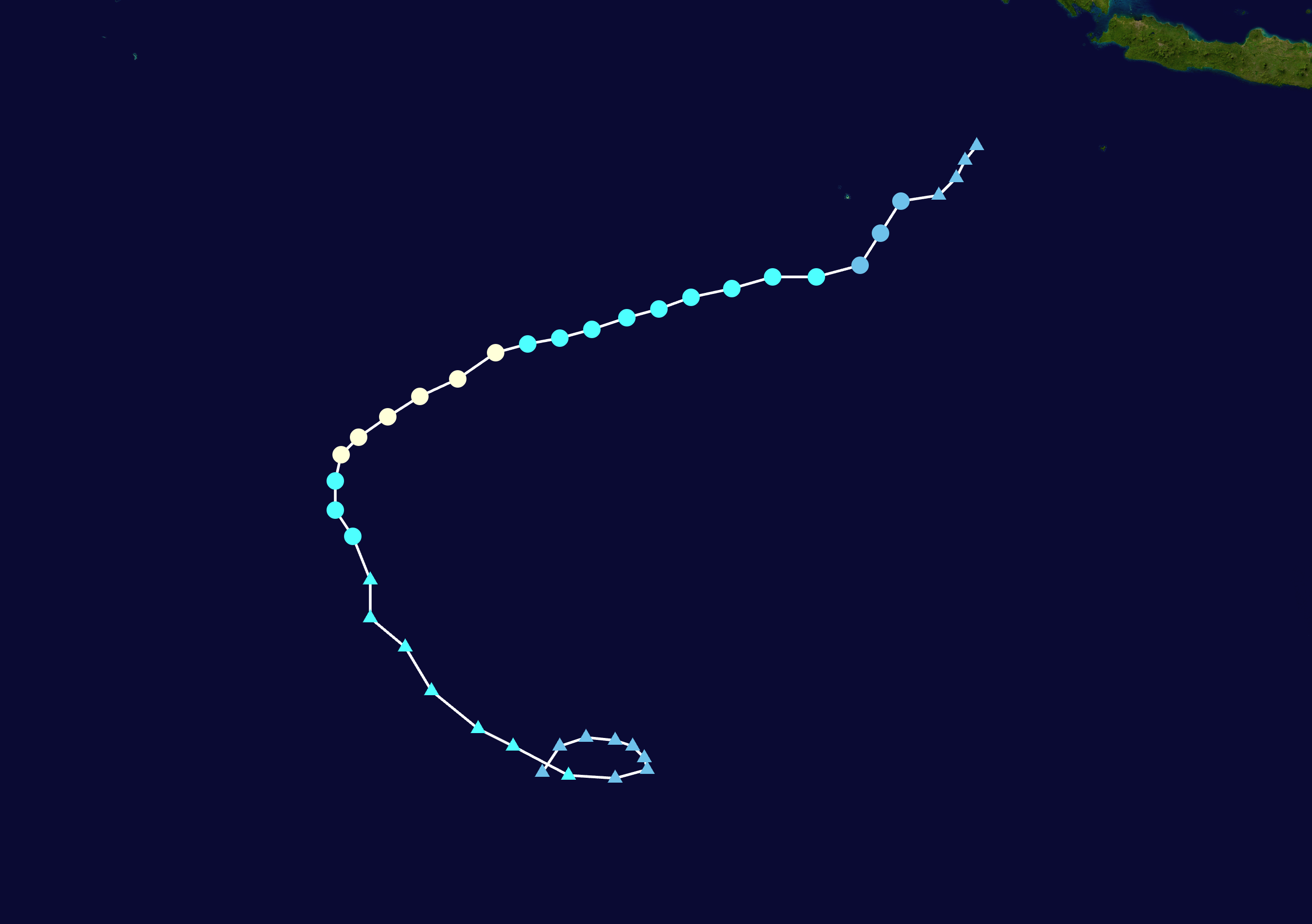
- Duration: March 8 (entered basin) – March 11
- Peak intensity: 100 km/h (65 mph) (10-min); 980 hPa (mbar)

On March 6, an area of thunderstorms that TCWC Perth had been watching since March 3, became a tropical low. Later on the same day, the BoM designated the storm as Tropical Low 15U while the JTWC designated the storm as Tropical Cyclone 16S. On the morning of March 8, the low strengthened into a Category 1 tropical cyclone, assigning the name Koji. However, a few hours later, Koji moved west of 90°E, and was renamed Joni by the Mauritius Meteorological Service. Over the next few days, Joni continued to organize. However, on March 11, wind shear began eroding away the storm's outer bands of convection. On March 12, strong wind shear completely eroded away the storm's northern convection, and displaced the remaining convection to the southeast of the storm, leaving Joni's low level circulation center completely exposed. As a result, Joni rapidly began to weaken. Late on March 12, RSMC Reunion issued their last advisory on Koji–Joni, as the storm degenerated into an extratropical low.

=== Moderate Tropical Storm Kuena ===
- Moderate tropical storm (MFR)
- Tropical storm (SSHWS)
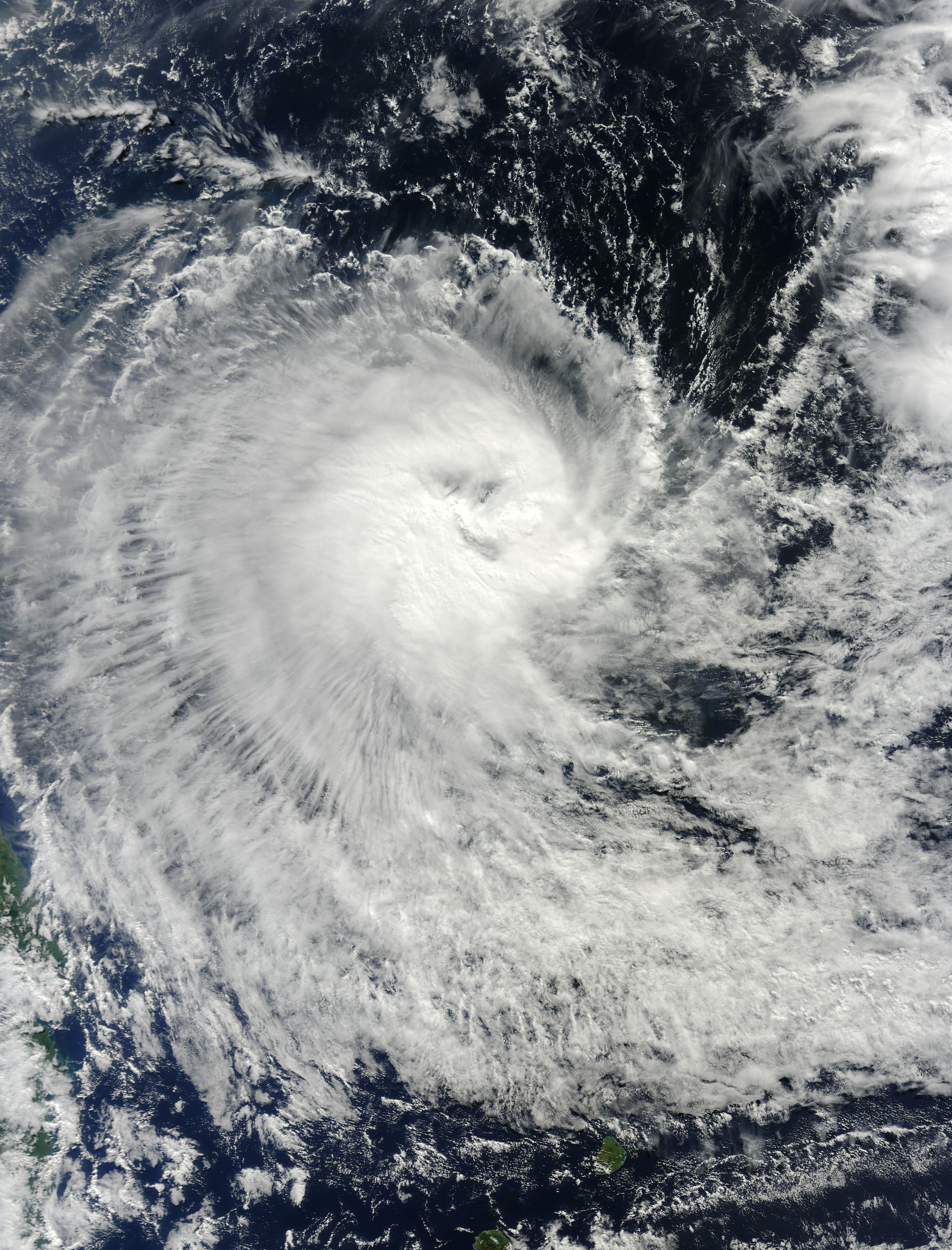
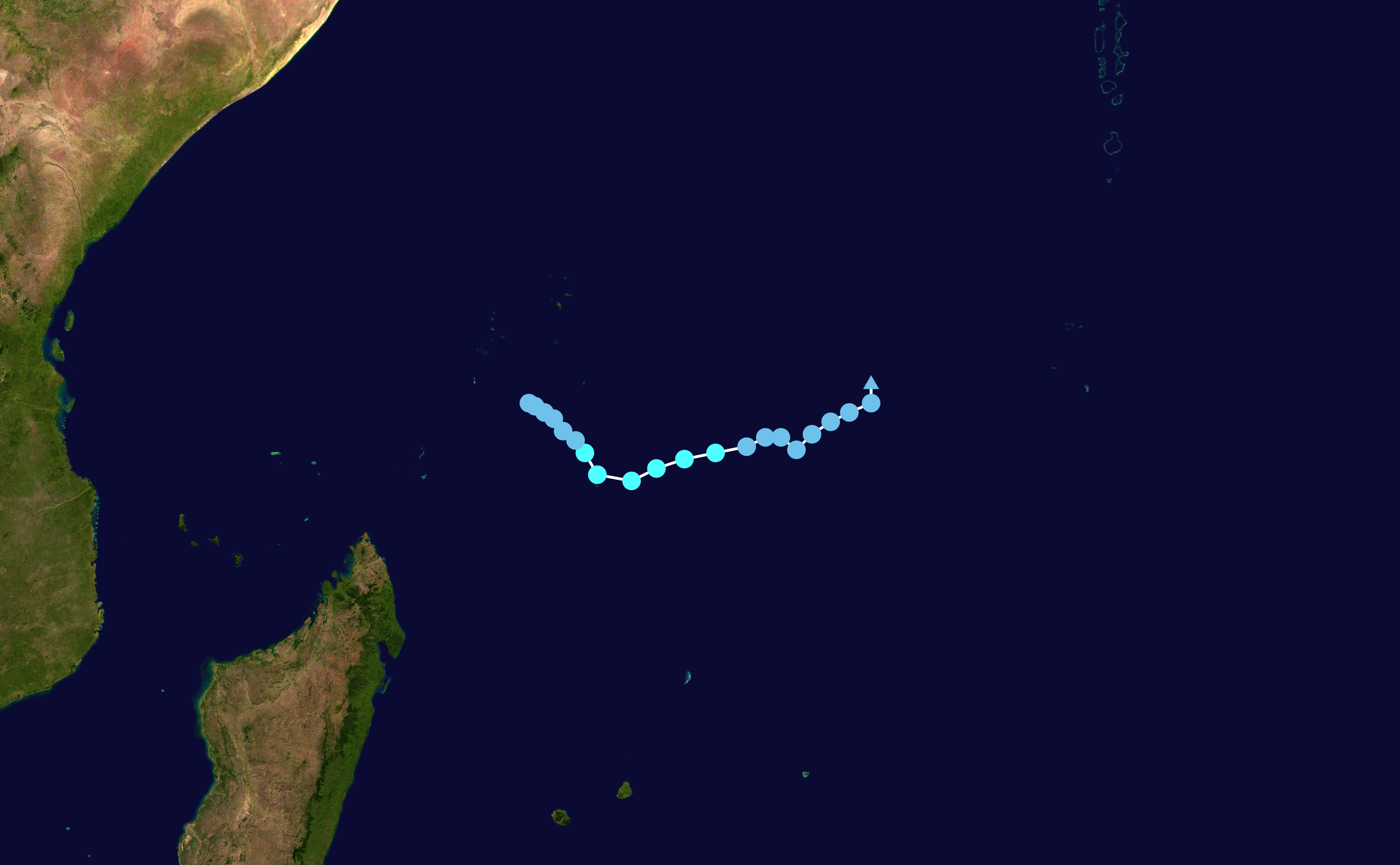
- Duration: June 3 – June 8
- Peak intensity: 85 km/h (50 mph) (10-min); 994 hPa (mbar)

On June 1, a tropical wave formed in the South West Indian Ocean. Two days later, the tropical wave organized into a low-pressure area, due to favorable conditions. On June 5, the low-pressure area was upgraded to a tropical disturbance by Météo-France, 400 miles (645 km) ENE of the Agaléga Islands, and later to a tropical depression. On June 6, JTWC designated it as Tropical Cyclone 20S, with the Mauritius Weather Service upgrading it to a moderate tropical storm naming it "Kuena" soon afterwards. Later, on the same day, the storm was upgraded to a severe tropical storm by MFR. On June 7, dry air, and moderate vertical wind shear caused the system's low level circulation center to become exposed. Soon afterwards, Kuena began to weaken. Late on June 7, RSMC La Réunion issued their last advisory on Kuena, as the storm weakened to a remnant low. Kuena was one of the most off-season storms ever recorded, forming approximately 2 months after the official end of the season.

== Storm names ==
Within the South-west Indian Ocean Tropical Depressions and Subtropical Depressions that are judged to have 10-minute sustained windspeeds of 65 km/h, (40 mph) by the Regional Specialized Meteorological Center on La Réunion Island, France (RSMC La Réunion) are usually assigned a name. However it is the Sub-Regional Tropical Cyclone Advisory Centers in Mauritius and Madagascar who name the systems. The Sub-Regional Tropical Cyclone Advisory Center in Mauritius names the storm should it intensify into a moderate tropical storm between 55°E and 90°E, if the storm should intensify into a moderate tropical storm between 30°E and 55°E then the Sub-Regional Tropical Cyclone Advisory Center in Madagascar assigns the appropriate name to the storm. For the final year, tropical cyclones that move into this region from the Australian region will be renamed by the Sub-Regional Tropical Cyclone Advisory Center in Mauritius, however tropical cyclones moving into the Australian region will not be renamed. New name lists are used every year, whilst a name is normally only used once so thus no names are retired.

- Alenga
- Benilde
- Chanda
- Dando
- Ethel
- Funso
- Giovanna
- Hilwa
- Irina
- Joni
- Kuena
- Lesego (unused)
- Michel (unused)
- Noyana (unused)
- Olivier (unused)
- Pokera (unused)
- Quincy (unused)
- Rebaone (unused)
- Salama (unused)
- Tristan (unused)
- Ursula (unused)
- Violet (unused)
- Wilson (unused)
- Xavier (unused)
- Yekela (unused)
- Zania (unused)

== Season effects ==
This table lists all of the tropical cyclones and subtropical cyclones that were monitored during the 2011–2012 South-West Indian Ocean cyclone season. Information on their intensity, duration, name, areas affected, primarily comes from RSMC La Réunion. Death and damage reports come from either press reports or the relevant national disaster management agency while the damage totals are given in 2012 USD.

Name	Dates	Peak intensity			Areas affected	Damage (USD)	Deaths	Ref(s).
Name	Dates	Category	Wind speed	Pressure	Areas affected	Damage (USD)	Deaths	Ref(s).
Alenga	December 4–7	Moderate tropical storm	85 km/h (55 mph)	994 hPa (29.35 inHg)	None	None	None	
02	December 6–16	Tropical depression	55 km/h (35 mph)	998 hPa (29.47 inHg)	None	None	None	
03	December 19–23	Subtropical depression	55 km/h (35 mph)	1,000 hPa (29.53 inHg)	Madagascar	None	None	
Benilde	December 28 – January 4	Tropical cyclone	150 km/h (95 mph)	968 hPa (28.59 inHg)	None	None	None	
Chanda	January 5–10	Moderate tropical storm	75 km/h (45 mph)	992 hPa (29.29 inHg)	Madagascar	Unknown	1	
Dando	January 10–18	Subtropical depression	85 km/h (55 mph)	992 hPa (29.29 inHg)	Madagascar, Mozambique, South Africa, Zimbabwe, Swaziland	Unknown	10	
Ethel	January 17–22	Severe tropical storm	100 km/h (60 mph)	972 hPa (28.70 inHg)	Rodrigues	Unknown	1	
Funso	January 17–28	Intense tropical cyclone	205 km/h (125 mph)	925 hPa (27.32 inHg)	Mozambique, Malawi	Unknown	40	
Giovanna	February 7–22	Intense tropical cyclone	195 km/h (120 mph)	935 hPa (27.61 inHg)	Mauritius, Réunion, Madagascar	Unknown	35	
Hilwa	February 14–22	Moderate tropical storm	75 km/h (45 mph)	993 hPa (29.32 inHg)	Rodrigues	None	None	
Irina	February 25 – March 12	Severe tropical storm	95 km/h (60 mph)	978 hPa (28.88 inHg)	Madagascar, Mozambique, Swaziland, South Africa	Unknown	77	
12	February 29 – March 3	Tropical depression	55 km/h (35 mph)	996 hPa (29.41 inHg)	None	None	None	
Koji–Joni	March 8–11	Severe tropical storm	100 km/h (60 mph)	980 hPa (28.94 inHg)	None	None	None	
Kuena	June 3–8	Moderate tropical storm	85 km/h (55 mph)	994 hPa (29.35 inHg)	None	None	None	
Season aggregates
14 systems	December 4 – June 8		205 km/h (125 mph)	925 hPa (27.32 inHg)		Unknown	164	

== See also ==
- Tropical cyclones in 2011 and 2012
- South-West Indian Ocean tropical cyclone
- List of Southern Hemisphere tropical cyclone seasons
- Atlantic hurricane seasons: 2011, 2012
- Pacific hurricane seasons: 2011, 2012
- Pacific typhoon seasons: 2011, 2012
- North Indian Ocean cyclone seasons: 2011, 2012
- 2011–12 Australian region cyclone season
- 2011–12 South Pacific cyclone season
