= Timeline of the 2012 Pacific hurricane season =

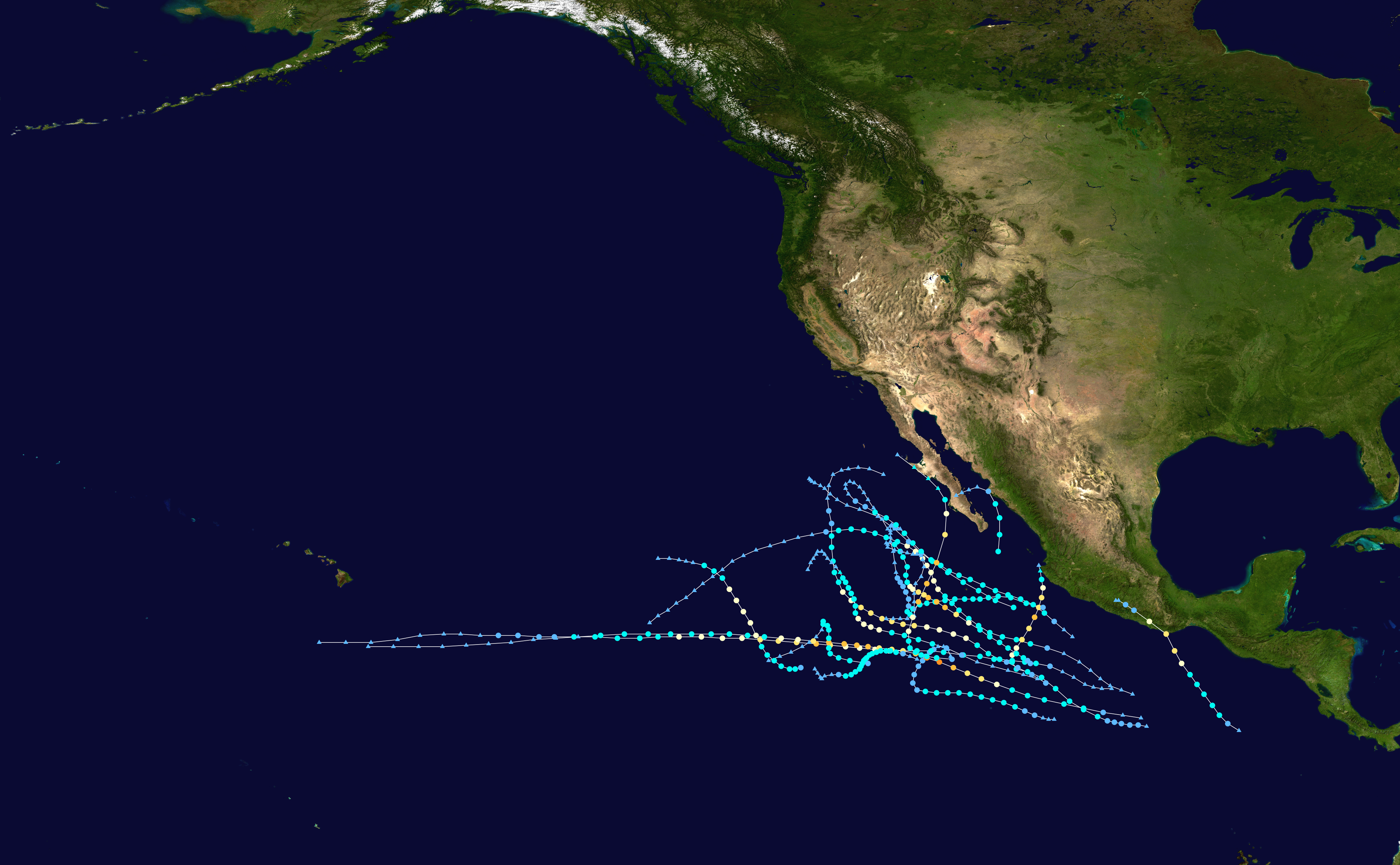
- Season summary map

Season boundaries
- First system formed: May 14, 2012
- Last system dissipated: November 3, 2012

Strongest system
- Name: Emilia
- Maximum winds: 140 mph (220 km/h) (1-minute sustained)
- Lowest pressure: 945 mbar (hPa; 27.91 inHg)

Longest lasting system
- Name: Daniel and Emilia (tie)
- Duration: 8.25 days
Storm articles
- Hurricane Bud (2012)
- Hurricane Carlotta (2012)
- Tropical Storm Norman (2012)
- Hurricane Paul (2012)

The 2012 Pacific hurricane season was an above-average year for tropical cyclogenesis. (Note: An average season, as defined by the National Oceanic and Atmospheric Administration, has fifteen tropical storms, eight hurricanes and three major hurricanes.) The hurricane season officially began on May 15 in the east Pacific—defined as the region east of 140°W—and on June 1 in the central Pacific—defined as the region west of 140°W to the International Date Line—and ended on November 30 in both regions. These dates conventionally delimit the period during each year when most tropical cyclones form in the northeastern Pacific Ocean. This year, the first storm of the season, Tropical Storm Aletta, formed on May 14, and the last, Tropical Storm Rosa, dissipated on November 3. Altogether, seventeen named storms formed; ten became hurricanes, and five further intensified into major hurricanes. (Note: A major hurricane is a storm that ranks as Category 3 or higher on the Saffir–Simpson hurricane wind scale.)

This timeline documents tropical cyclone formations, strengthening, weakening, landfalls, extratropical transitions, and dissipations during the season. It includes information that was not released throughout the season, meaning that data from post-storm reviews by the National Hurricane Center and the Central Pacific Hurricane Center, such as a storm that was not initially warned upon, has been included.

The time stamp for each event is first stated using Coordinated Universal Time (UTC), the 24-hour clock where 00:00 = midnight UTC. The NHC uses both UTC and the time zone where the center of the tropical cyclone is currently located. Prior to 2015, two time zones were utilized in the Eastern Pacific basin: Pacific east of 140°W, and Hawaii−Aleutian from 140°W to the International Date Line. In this timeline, the respective area time is included in parentheses. Additionally, figures for maximum sustained winds and position estimates are rounded to the nearest 5 units (miles, or kilometers), following National Hurricane Center practice. Direct wind observations are rounded to the nearest whole number. Atmospheric pressures are listed to the nearest millibar and nearest hundredth of an inch of mercury.

== Timeline ==
=== May ===
May 14

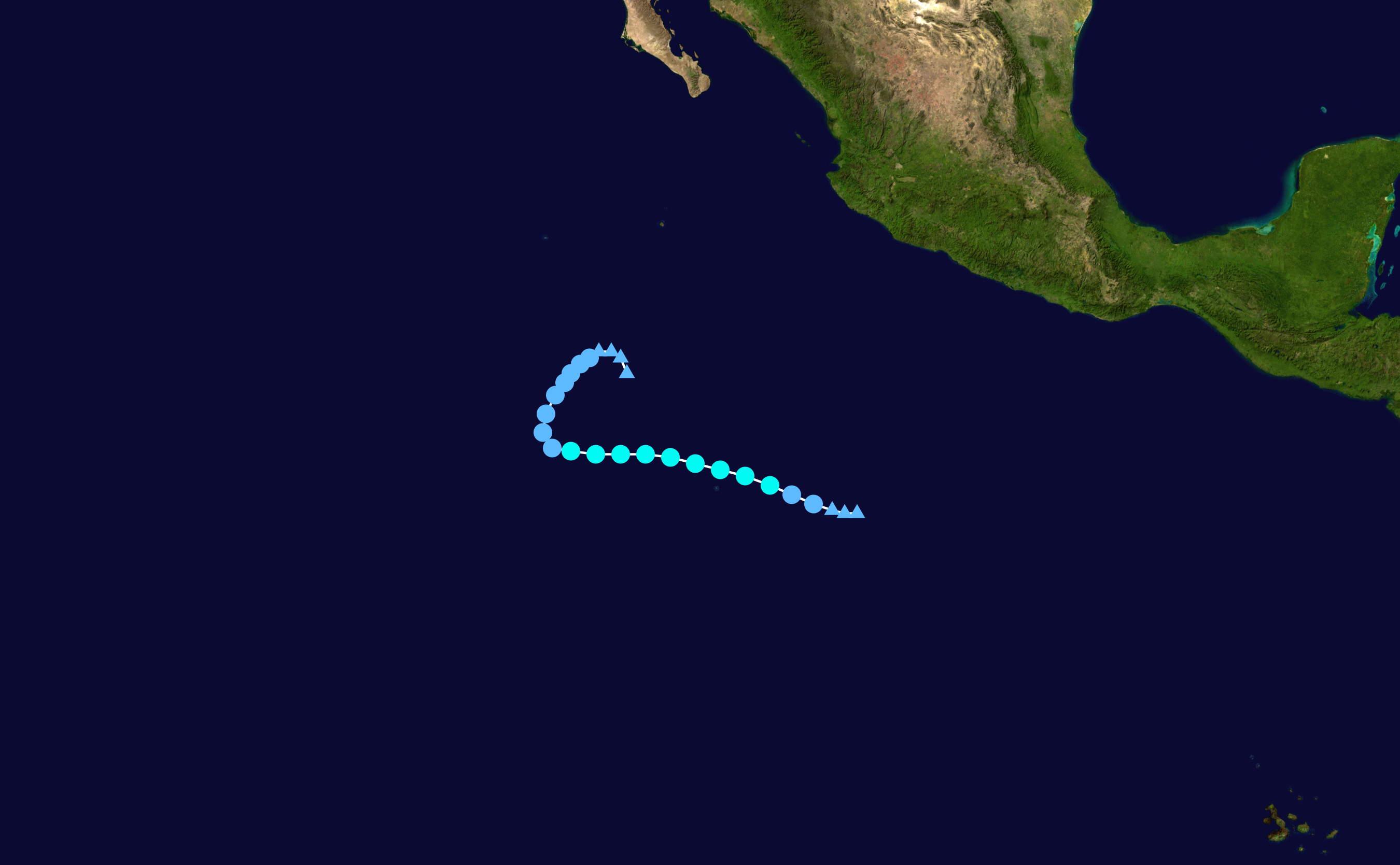
Storm path of Tropical Storm Aletta

- 1200 UTC (5:00 a.m. PDT) – Tropical Depression One-E develops from an area of low pressure about 655 mi (1,054 km) south of Manzanillo, Mexico.

May 15

- The 2012 Pacific hurricane season officially begins.
- 0000 UTC (5:00 p.m. PDT May 14) – Tropical Depression One-E intensifies into Tropical Storm Aletta.

May 16

- 0000 UTC (5:00 p.m. PDT May 15) – Tropical Storm Aletta attains its peak intensity with maximum sustained winds of 50 mph (80 km/h) and a minimum barometric pressure of 1000 mb (hPa; 29.53 inHg).

May 17

- 0600 UTC (11:00 p.m. PDT May 16) – Tropical Storm Aletta weakens to a tropical depression roughly 825 mi (1,328 km) southwest of the southern tip of Baja California.

May 19

- 0600 UTC (11:00 p.m. PDT May 18) – Tropical Depression Aletta degenerates into a non-convective remnant area of low pressure.

May 20

- 1800 UTC (11:00 a.m. PDT) – Tropical Depression Two-E develops from an area of low pressure about 520 mi (840 km) south of Acapulco, Mexico.

May 22

- 0600 UTC (11:00 p.m. PDT May 21) – Tropical Depression Two-E intensifies into Tropical Storm Bud roughly 495 mi (797 km) south-southwest of Acapulco, Mexico.

May 24

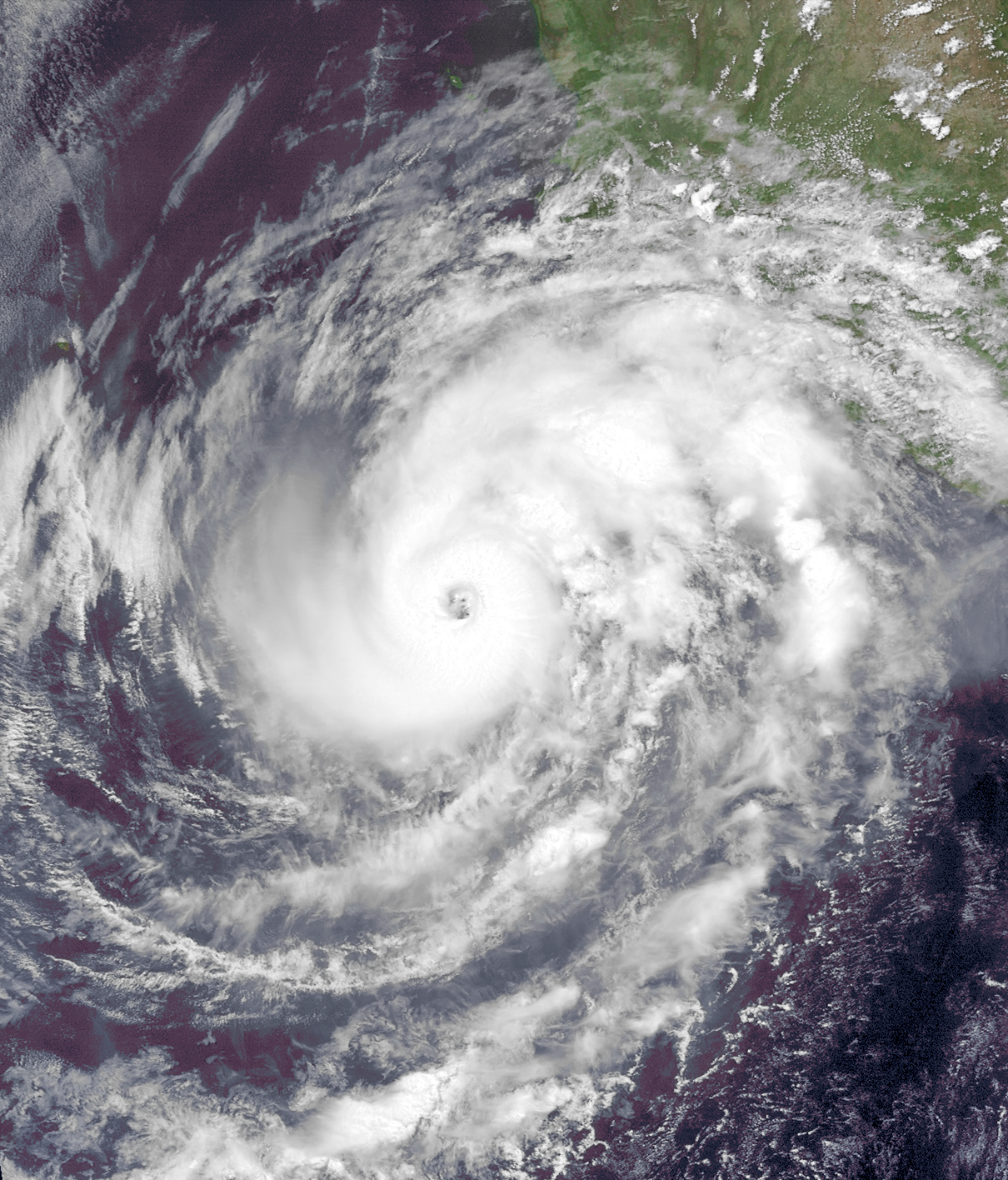
Hurricane Bud prior to peak intensity on May 24

- 0000 UTC (5:00 p.m. PDT May 23) – Tropical Storm Bud intensifies into a Category 1 hurricane on the Saffir–Simpson hurricane wind scale, becoming the first of the 2012 season.
- 1200 UTC (5:00 a.m. PDT) – Hurricane Bud intensifies into a Category 2 hurricane.

May 25

- 0000 UTC (5:00 p.m. PDT May 24) – Hurricane Bud intensifies into a Category 3 hurricane, the first major hurricane of the 2012 season, and simultaneously attains its peak intensity with winds of 115 mph (185 km/h) and a minimum barometric pressure of 961 mb (hPa; 28.38 inHg).
- 0600 UTC (11:00 p.m. PDT May 24) – Hurricane Bud weakens to a Category 2 hurricane.
- 1800 UTC (11:00 a.m. PDT) – Hurricane Bud weakens to a Category 1 hurricane about 80 mi (130 km) west-southwest of Manzanillo, Mexico.

May 26

- 0000 UTC (5:00 p.m. PDT May 25) – Hurricane Bud weakens to a tropical storm.
- 0600 UTC (11:00 p.m. PDT May 25) – Tropical Storm Bud degenerates into a non-convective remnant area of low pressure near the southwestern coast of Mexico.

=== June ===
June 14

- 0000 UTC (5:00 p.m. PDT June 13) – Tropical Depression Three-E develops from an area of low pressure roughly 530 mi (850 km) south-southeast of Huatulco, Mexico.
- 0600 UTC (11:00 p.m. PDT June 13) – Tropical Depression Three-E intensifies into Tropical Storm Carlotta.

June 15

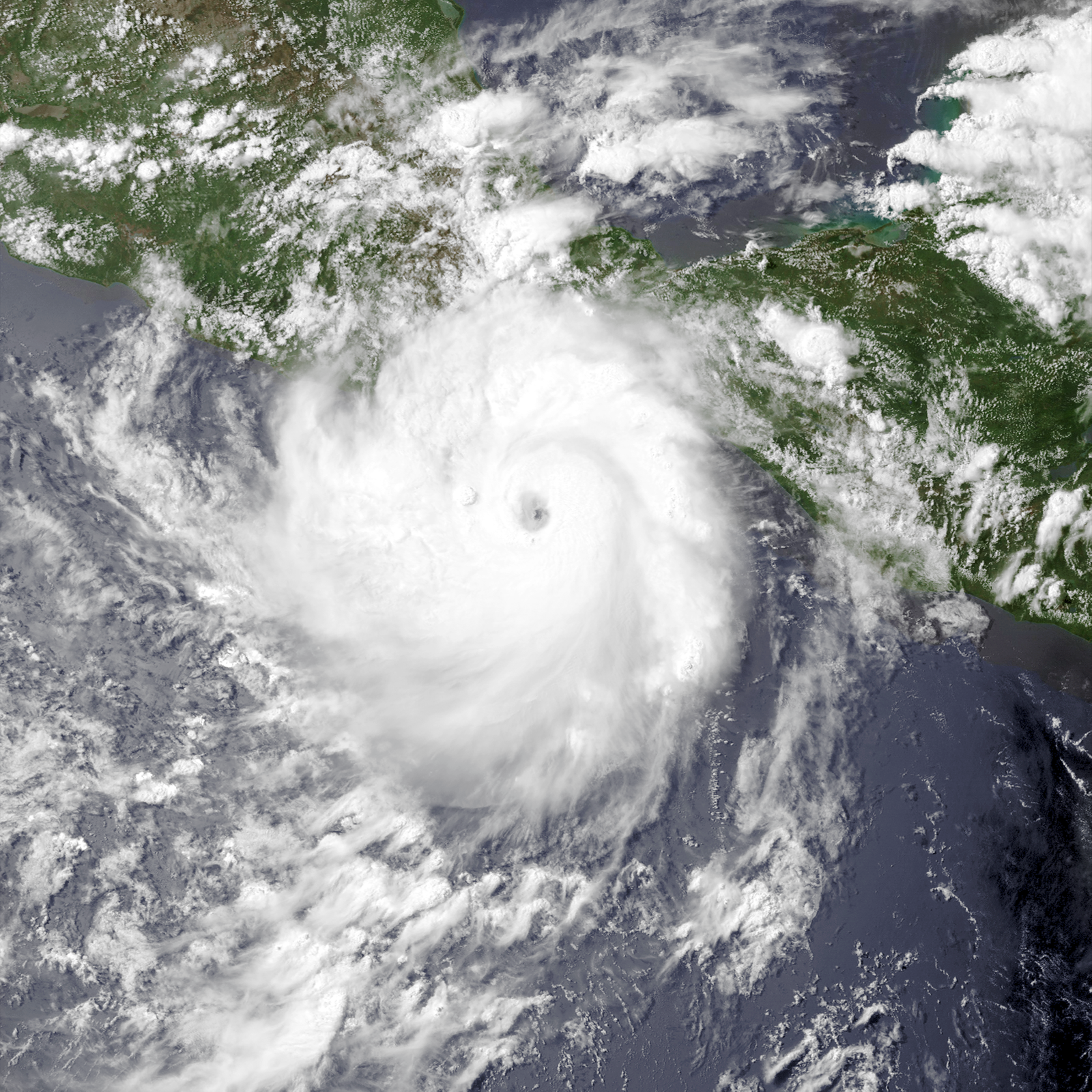
Hurricane Carlotta nearing Mexico on June 15

- 1200 UTC (5:00 a.m. PDT) – Tropical Storm Carlotta intensifies into a Category 1 hurricane about 365 mi (587 km) southeast of Acapulco, Mexico.
- 1800 UTC (11:00 a.m. PDT) – Hurricane Carlotta rapidly intensifies into a Category 2 hurricane.
- 2100 UTC (2:00 p.m. PDT) – Hurricane Carlotta attains its peak intensity with maximum sustained winds of 110 mph (180 km/h) and a minimum barometric pressure of 973 mb (hPa; 28.71 inHg).

June 16

- 0100 UTC (6:00 p.m. PDT June 15) – Hurricane Carlotta makes landfall near Puerto Escondido, Mexico, with winds of 105 mph (169 km/h).
- 0600 UTC (11:00 p.m. PDT June 15) – Hurricane Carlotta weakens to a Category 1 hurricane.
- 0900 UTC (2:00 a.m. PDT) – Hurricane Carlotta weakens to a tropical storm.
- 1200 UTC (5:00 a.m. PDT) – Tropical Storm Carlotta weakens to a tropical depression roughly 60 mi (97 km) north-northeast of Acapulco, Mexico.

June 17

- 0000 UTC (5:00 p.m. PDT June 16) – Tropical Depression Carlotta degenerates into a non-convective remnant area of low pressure about 100 mi (160 km) northeast of Zihuatanejo, Mexico.

=== July ===
July 4

- 0600 UTC (11:00 p.m. PDT July 3) – Tropical Depression Four-E develops from an area of low pressure about 490 mi (790 km) south of Manzanillo, Mexico.

July 5

- 0600 UTC (11:00 p.m. PDT July 4) – Tropical Depression Four-E intensifies into Tropical Storm Daniel roughly 475 mi (764 km) southwest of Manzanillo, Mexico.

July 7

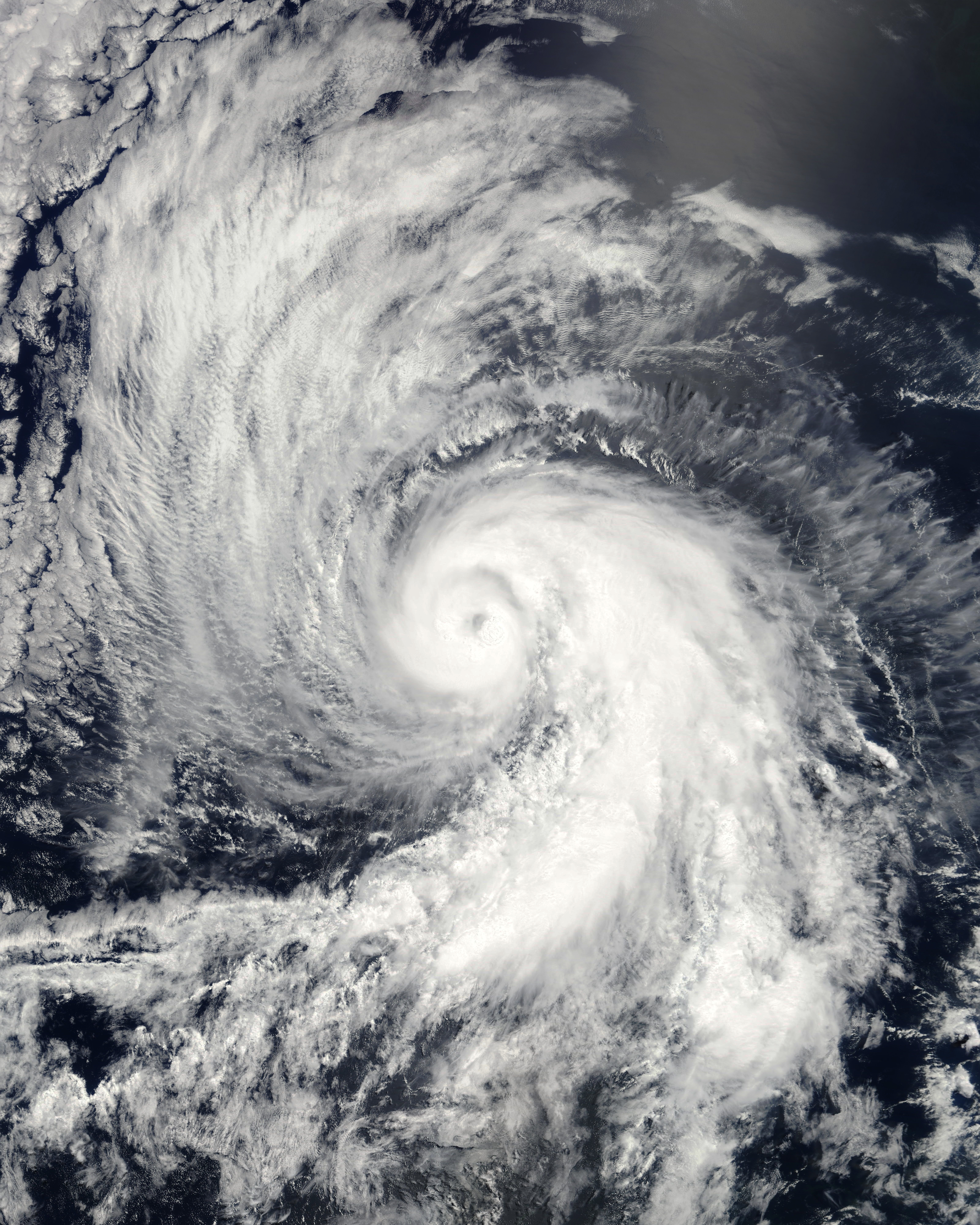
Hurricane Daniel as a Category 1 hurricane on July 7

- 0000 UTC (5:00 p.m. PDT July 6) Tropical Storm Daniel intensifies into a Category 1 hurricane about 720 mi (1,160 km) southwest of the southern tip of Baja California.
- 1800 UTC (11:00 a.m. PDT) – Tropical Depression Five-E develops from an area of low pressure roughly 495 mi (797 km) south-southwest of Acapulco, Mexico.

July 8

- 0000 UTC (5:00 p.m. PDT July 7) – Hurricane Daniel intensifies into a Category 2 hurricane.
- 0000 UTC (5:00 p.m. PDT July 7) – Tropical Depression Five-E intensifies into Tropical Storm Emilia about 490 mi (790 km) south-southwest of Acapulco, Mexico.
- 0600 UTC (11:00 p.m. PDT July 7) – Hurricane Daniel intensifies into a Category 3 hurricane and simultaneously attains its peak intensity with winds of 115 mph (185 km/h) and a minimum barometric pressure of 961 mb (hPa; 28.38 inHg).
- 1200 UTC (5:00 a.m. PDT) – Hurricane Daniel weakens to a Category 2 hurricane roughly 1,015 mi (1,633 km) southwest of the southern tip of Baja California.

July 9

- 0600 UTC (11:00 p.m. PDT July 8) – Hurricane Daniel weakens to a Category 1 hurricane.
- 0600 UTC (11:00 p.m. PDT July 8) – Tropical Storm Emilia intensifies into a Category 1 hurricane about 680 mi (1,090 km) southwest of Acapulco, Mexico.
- 1200 UTC (5:00 a.m. PDT) – Hurricane Emilia rapidly intensifies into a Category 2 hurricane.

July 10

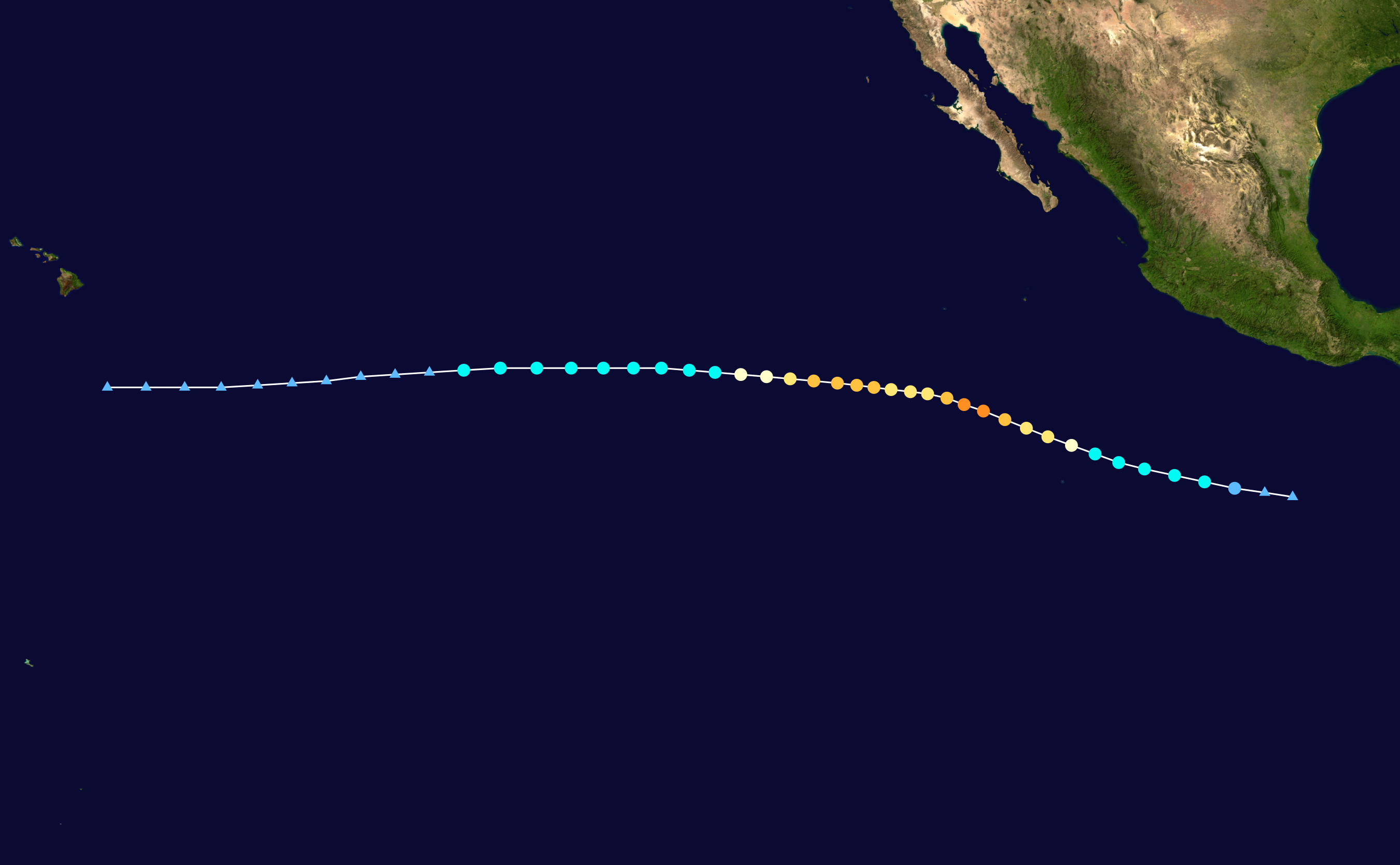
Storm Path of Hurricane Emilia

- 0000 UTC (5:00 p.m. PDT July 9) – Hurricane Emilia rapidly intensifies into a Category 3 hurricane.
- 0600 UTC (11:00 p.m. PDT July 9) – Hurricane Daniel weakens to a tropical storm about 1,465 mi (2,358 km) southeast of the Hawaiian Islands.
- 0600 UTC (11:00 p.m. PDT July 9) – Hurricane Emilia intensifies into a Category 4 hurricane and simultaneously attains its peak intensity with winds of 135 mph (217 km/h) and a minimum barometric pressure of 945 mb (hPa; 27.91 inHg).
- 1800 UTC (11:00 a.m. PDT) – Hurricane Emilia weakens to a Category 3 hurricane.

July 11

- 0000 UTC (5:00 p.m. PDT July 10) – Hurricane Emilia weakens to a Category 2 hurricane roughly 685 mi (1,102 km) south-southwest of the southern tip of Baja California.
- 1800 UTC (11:00 a.m. PDT) – Tropical Storm Daniel weakens to a tropical depression.
- 1800 UTC (11:00 a.m. PDT) – Hurricane Emilia re-intensifies into a Category 3 hurricane.

July 12

- 0000 UTC (5:00 p.m. PDT July 11) – Tropical Depression Six-E develops from an area of low pressure about 405 mi (652 km) south of Mazanillo, Mexico.
- 0600 UTC (11:00 p.m. PDT July 11) – Tropical Depression Six-E intensifies into Tropical Storm Fabio.
- 1200 UTC (5:00 a.m. PDT) – Tropical Depression Daniel degenerates into a non-convective remnant area of low pressure roughly 665 mi (1,070 km) southeast of the Hawaiian Islands.
- 1800 UTC (11:00 a.m. PDT) – Hurricane Emilia weakens to a Category 2 hurricane for a second time.

July 13

- 0000 UTC (5:00 p.m. PDT July 12) – Hurricane Emilia weakens to a Category 1 hurricane about 1,000 mi (1,600 km) southwest of the southern tip of Baja California.
- 1200 UTC (5:00 a.m. PDT) – Hurricane Emilia weakens to a tropical storm.
- 1800 UTC (11:00 a.m. PDT) – Tropical Storm Fabio intensifies into a Category 1 hurricane roughly 515 mi (829 km) southwest of Manzanillo, Mexico.

July 14

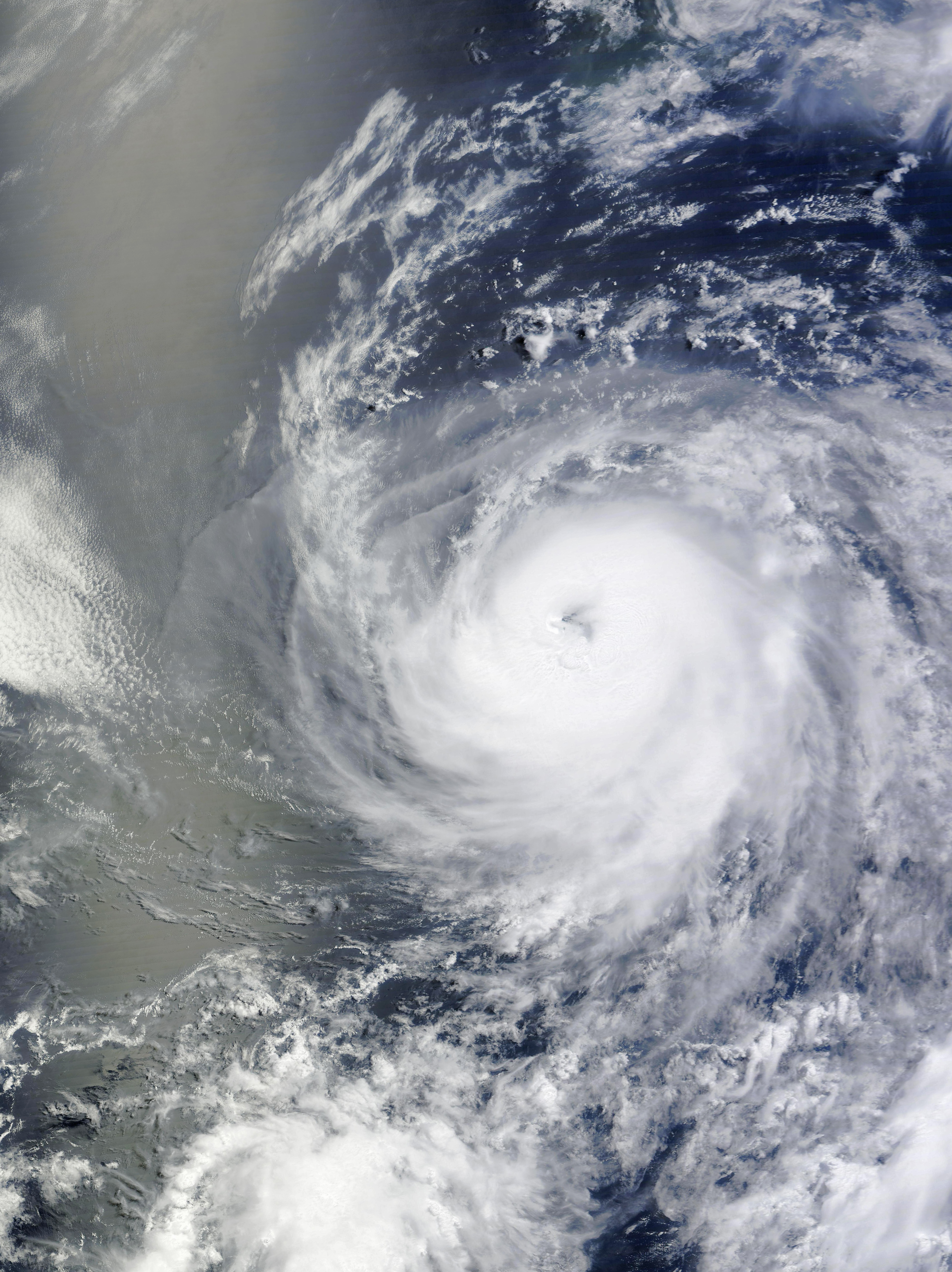
Hurricane Fabio near peak intensity on July 14

- 1800 UTC (11:00 a.m. PDT) – Hurricane Fabio intensifies into a Category 2 hurricane.

July 15

- 0600 UTC (11:00 p.m. PDT July 14) – Hurricane Fabio attains its peak intensity with maximum sustained winds of 110 mph (180 km/h) and a minimum barometric pressure of 966 mb (hPa; 28.53 inHg).
- 1800 UTC (11:00 a.m. PDT) – Tropical Storm Emilia degenerates into a non-convective remnant area of low pressure roughly 1,110 mi (1,790 km) southeast of the Hawaiian Islands.

July 16

- 0000 UTC (5:00 p.m. PDT July 15) – Hurricane Fabio weakens to a Category 1 hurricane.
- 1800 UTC (11:00 a.m. PDT) – Hurricane Fabio weakens to a tropical storm about 700 mi (1,100 km) southwest of the southern tip of Baja California.

July 18

- 0000 UTC (5:00 p.m. PDT July 17) – Tropical Storm Fabio weakens to a tropical depression.
- 1200 UTC (5:00 a.m. PDT) – Tropical Depression Fabio degenerates into a non-convective remnant area of low pressure roughly 400 mi (640 km) west-southwest of Punta Eugenia, Mexico.

=== August ===
August 7

- 0600 UTC (11:00 p.m. PDT August 6) – Tropical Depression Seven-E develops from an area of low pressure about 600 mi (970 km) west-southwest of Manzanillo, Mexico.
- 1800 UTC (11:00 a.m. PDT) – Tropical Depression Seven-E intensifies into Tropical Storm Gilma roughly 565 mi (909 km) west-southwest of Manzanillo, Mexico.

August 8

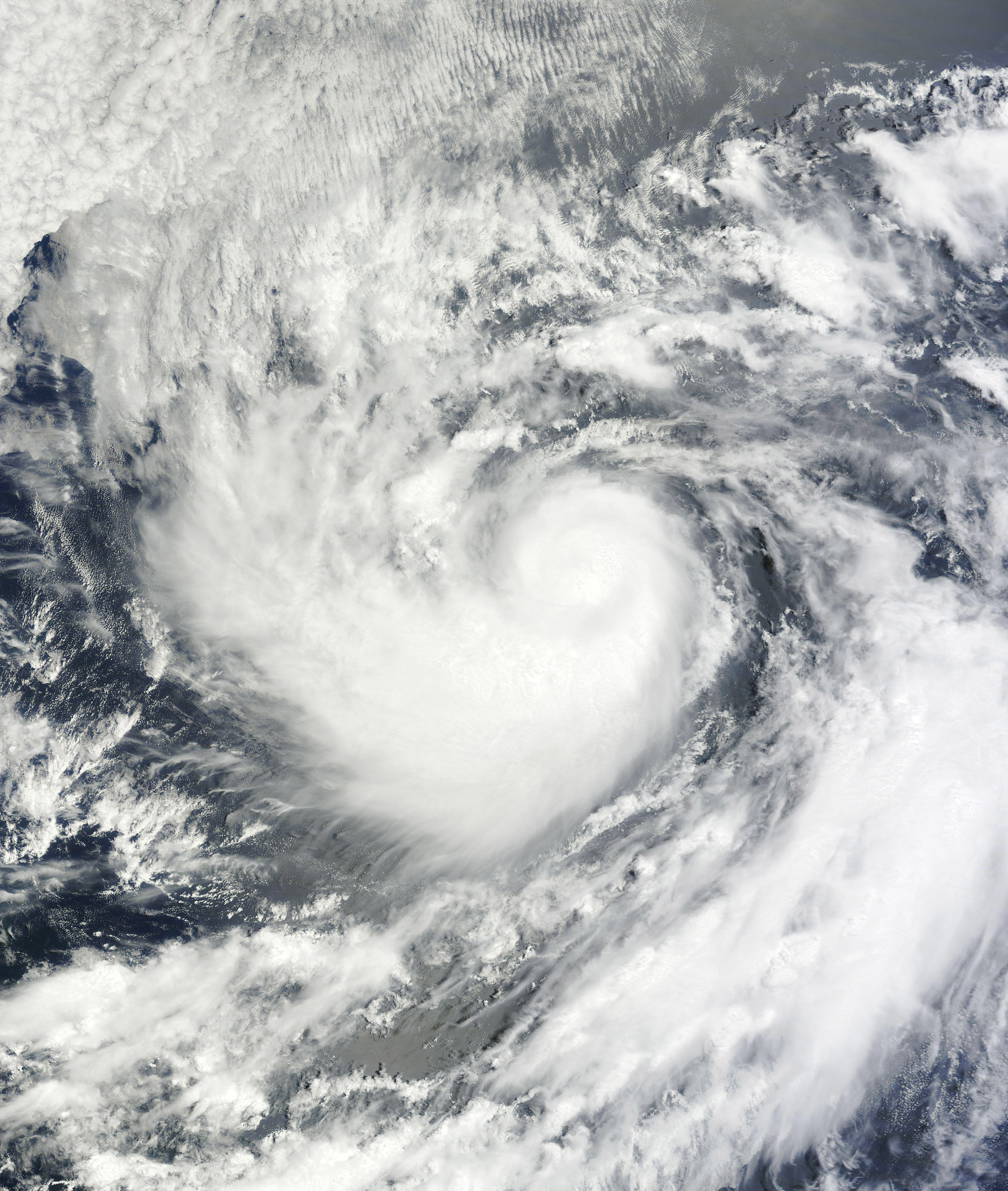
Hurricane Gilma near peak intensity on August 8

- 1800 UTC (11:00 a.m. PDT) – Tropical Storm Gilma intensifies into a Category 1 hurricane.

August 9

- 0600 UTC (11:00 p.m. PDT August 8) – Hurricane Gilma attains its peak intensity with maximum sustained winds of 80 mph (130 km/h) and a minimum barometric pressure of 984 mb (hPa; 29.06 inHg).
- 1800 UTC (11:00 a.m. PDT) – Hurricane Gilma weakens to a tropical storm about 700 mi (1,100 km) southwest of the southern tip of Baja California.

August 11

- 1200 UTC (5:00 a.m. PDT) – Tropical Storm Gilma degenerates into a non-convective remnant area of low pressure roughly 680 mi (1,090 km) west-southwest of the southern tip of Baja California.
- 1200 UTC (5:00 a.m. PDT) – Tropical Depression Eight-E develops from an area of low pressure about 125 mi (201 km) south-southwest of Manzanillo, Mexico.
- 1800 UTC (11:00 a.m. PDT) – Tropical Depression Eight-E intensifies into Tropical Storm Hector roughly 180 mi (290 km) south-southwest of Manzanillo, Mexico.

August 12

- 1200 UTC (5:00 a.m. PDT) – Tropical Storm Hector attains its peak intensity with maximum sustained winds of 50 mph (80 km/h) and a minimum barometric pressure of 995 mb (hPa; 29.39 inHg).

August 15

- 1200 UTC (5:00 a.m. PDT) – Tropical Storm Hector weakens to a tropical depression about 495 mi (797 km) southwest of the southern tip of Baja California.

August 17

- 0000 UTC (5:00 p.m. PDT August 16) – Tropical Depression Hector degenerates into a non-convective remnant area of low pressure roughly 440 mi (710 km) southwest of the southern tip of Baja California.

August 27

- 1200 UTC (5:00 a.m. PDT) – Tropical Depression Nine-E develops from an area of low pressure about 375 mi (604 km) south-southwest of Manzanillo, Mexico.
- 1800 UTC (11:00 a.m. PDT) – Tropical Depression Nine-E intensifies into Tropical Storm Ileana roughly 315 mi (507 km) south-southwest of Manzanillo, Mexico.

August 30

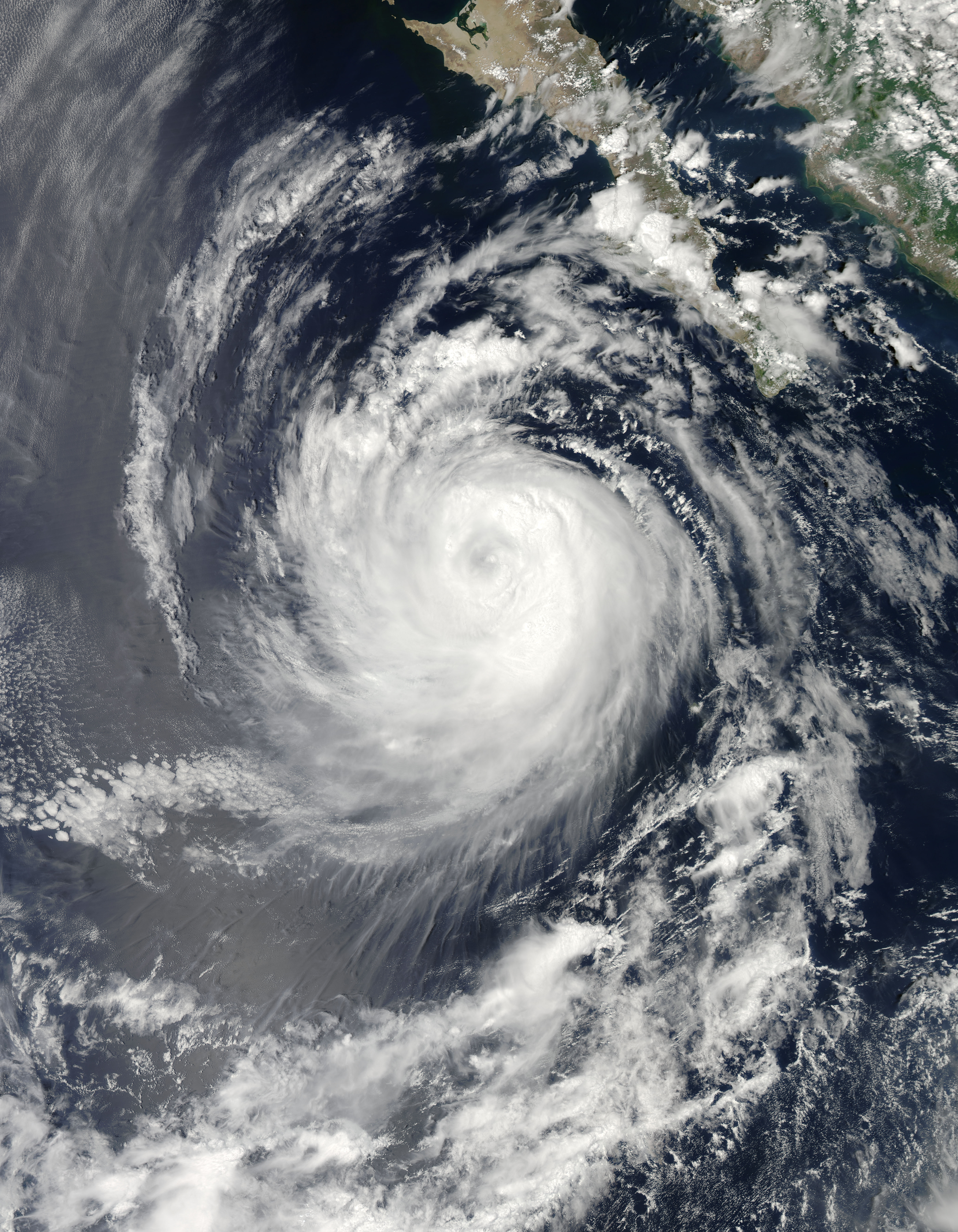
Hurricane Ileana at peak intensity on August 30

- 0000 UTC (5:00 p.m. PDT August 29) – Tropical Storm Ileana intensifies into a Category 1 hurricane about 340 mi (550 km) south-southwest of the southern tip of Baja California.
- 1800 UTC (11:00 a.m. PDT) – Hurricane Ileana attains its peak intensity with maximum sustained winds of 85 mph (140 km) and a minimum barometric pressure of 978 mb (hPa; 28.88 inHg).

August 31

- 1800 UTC (11:00 a.m. PDT) – Hurricane Ileana weakens to a tropical storm roughly 375 mi (604 km) west-southwest of the southern tip of Baja California.

=== September ===
September 2

- 0600 UTC (11:00 p.m. PDT September 1) – Tropical Storm Ileana weakens to a tropical depression about 660 mi (1,060 km) west of the southern tip of Baja California.
- 1200 UTC (5:00 a.m. PDT) – Tropical Depression Ileana degenerates into a non-convective remnant area of low pressure roughly 1,380 mi (2,220 km) east-southeast of the Hawaiian Islands.
- 1200 UTC (5:00 a.m. PDT) – Tropical Storm John develops from an area of low pressure about 230 mi (370 km) southwest of Manzanillo, Mexico.

September 3

- 0000 UTC (5:00 p.m. PDT September 2) – Tropical Storm John attains its peak intensity with maximum sustained winds of 45 mph (72 km/h) and a minimum barometric pressure of 1000 mb (hPa; 29.53 inHg).

September 4

- 0000 UTC (5:00 p.m. PDT September 3) – Tropical Storm John weakens to a tropical depression.
- 1200 UTC (5:00 a.m. PDT) – Tropical Depression John degenerates into a non-convective remnant area of low pressure roughly 395 mi (636 km) west-northwest of the southern tip of Baja California.

September 12

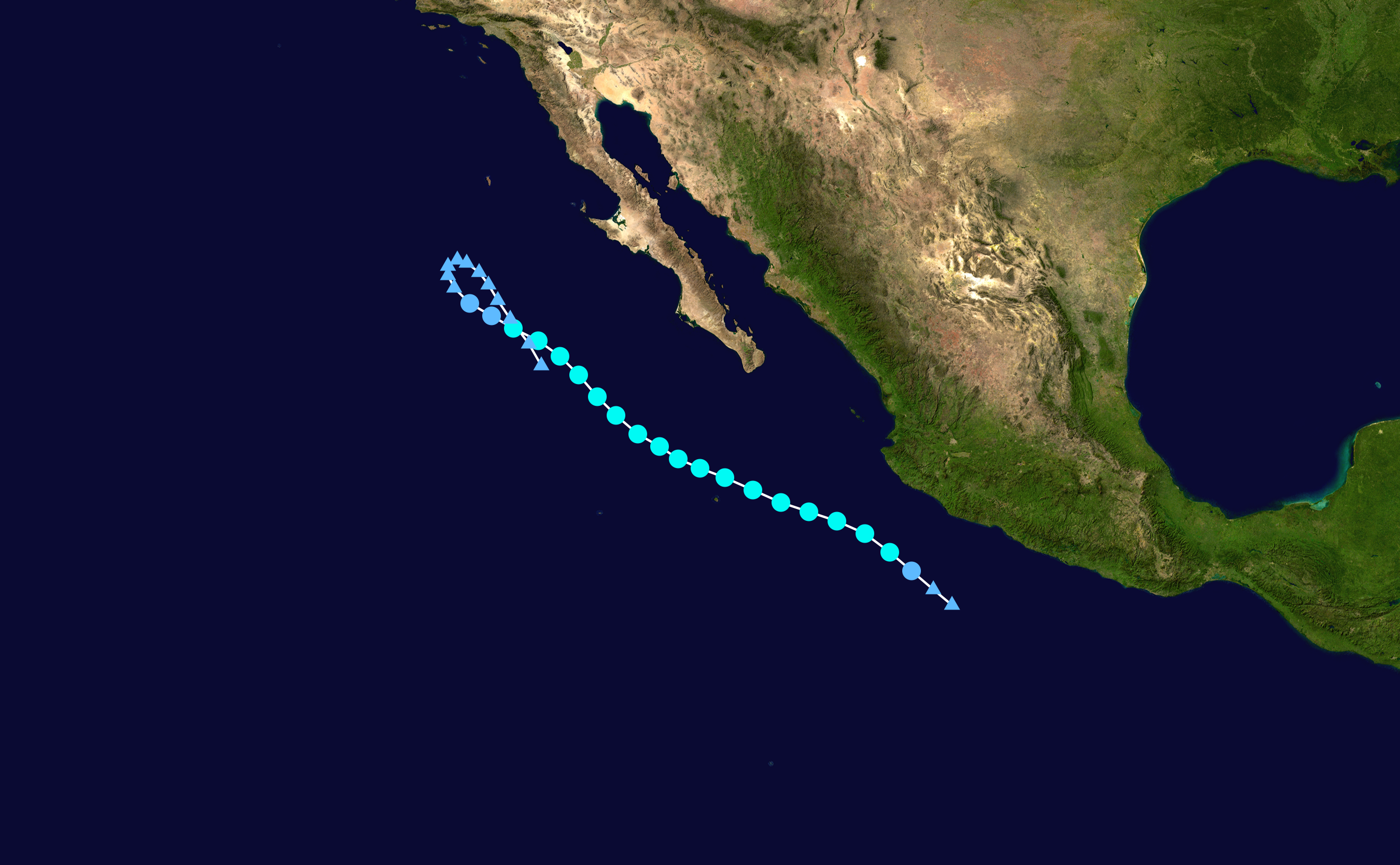
Storm path of Tropical Storm Kristy

- 0600 UTC (11:00 p.m. PDT September 11) – Tropical Depression Eleven-E develops from an area of low pressure about 175 mi (282 km) south-southwest of Manzanillo, Mexico.
- 1200 UTC (5:00 a.m. PDT) – Tropical Depression Eleven-E intensifies into Tropical Storm Kristy roughly 150 mi (240 km) south-southwest of Manzanillo, Mexico.

September 14

- 0600 UTC (11:00 p.m. PDT September 13) – Tropical Storm Kristy attains its peak intensity with maximum sustained winds of 60 mph (97 km/h) and a minimum barometric pressure of 998 mb (hPa; 29.47 inHg).

September 15

- 1200 UTC (5:00 a.m. PDT) – Tropical Depression Twelve-E develops from an area of low pressure about 1,080 mi (1,740 km) southwest of Cabo San Lucas, Mexico.
- 1800 UTC (11:00 a.m. PDT) – Tropical Depression Twelve-E intensifies into Tropical Storm Lane.

September 16

- 1800 UTC (11:00 a.m. PDT) – Tropical Storm Kristy weakens to a tropical depression about 540 mi (870 km) west-northwest of Cabo San Lucas, Mexico.

September 17

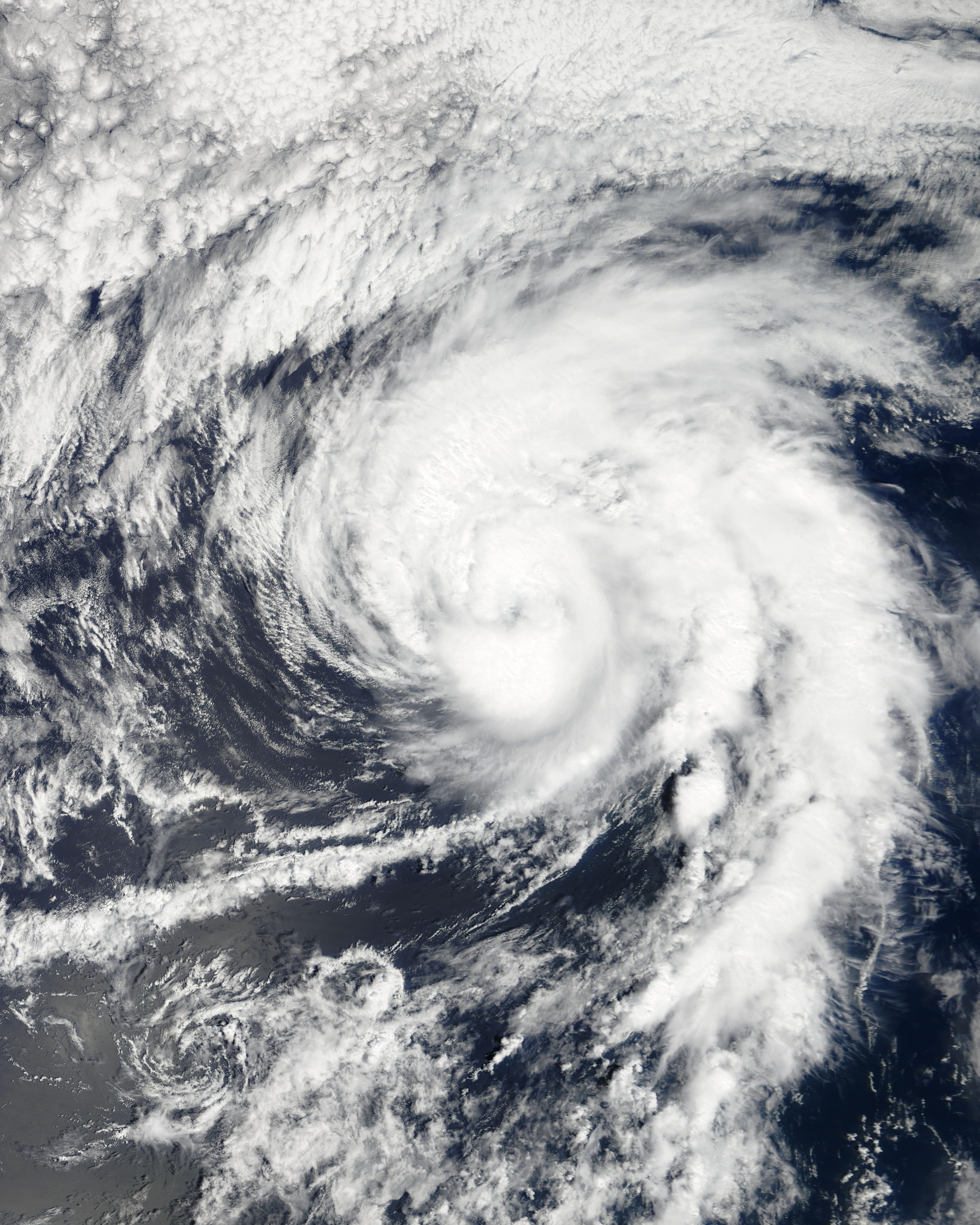
Hurricane Lane near peak intensity on September 17

- 0600 UTC (11:00 p.m. PDT September 16) – Tropical Depression Kristy degenerates into a non-convective remnant area of low pressure roughly 625 mi (1,006 km) west-northwest of Cabo San Lucas, Mexico.
- 0600 UTC (11:00 p.m. PDT September 16) – Tropical Storm Lane intensifies into a Category 1 hurricane about 1,170 mi (1,880 km) southwest of the southern tip of Baja California.

September 18

- 0000 UTC (5:00 p.m. PDT September 17) – Hurricane Lane attains its peak intensity with maximum sustained winds of 85 mph (137 km/h) and a minimum barometric pressure of 985 mb (hPa; 28.29 inHg).
- 1200 UTC (5:00 a.m. PDT) – Hurricane Lane weakens to a tropical storm.

September 19

- 0600 UTC (11:00 p.m. PDT September 18) – Tropical Storm Lane degenerates into a non-convective remnant area of low pressure roughly 1,330 mi (2,140 km) west-southwest of the southern tip of Baja California.

September 22

- 0000 UTC (5:00 p.m. PDT September 21) – Tropical Depression Thirteen-E develops from an area of low pressure about 415 mi (668 km) south-southwest of Manzanillo, Mexico.
- 1200 UTC (5:00 a.m. PDT) – Tropical Depression Thirteen-E intensifies into Tropical Storm Miriam.

September 24

- 0000 UTC (5:00 p.m. PDT September 23) – Tropical Storm Miriam intensifies into a Category 1 hurricane roughly 465 mi (748 km) southwest of Manzanillo, Mexico.
- 0600 UTC (11:00 p.m. PDT September 23) – Hurricane Miriam rapidly intensifies into a Category 2 hurricane.
- 1200 UTC (5:00 a.m. PDT) – Hurricane Miriam rapidly intensifies into a Category 3 hurricane and simultaneously attains its peak intensity with maximum sustained winds of 120 mph (190 km/h) and a minimum barometric pressure of 959 mb (hPa; 28.32 inHg).

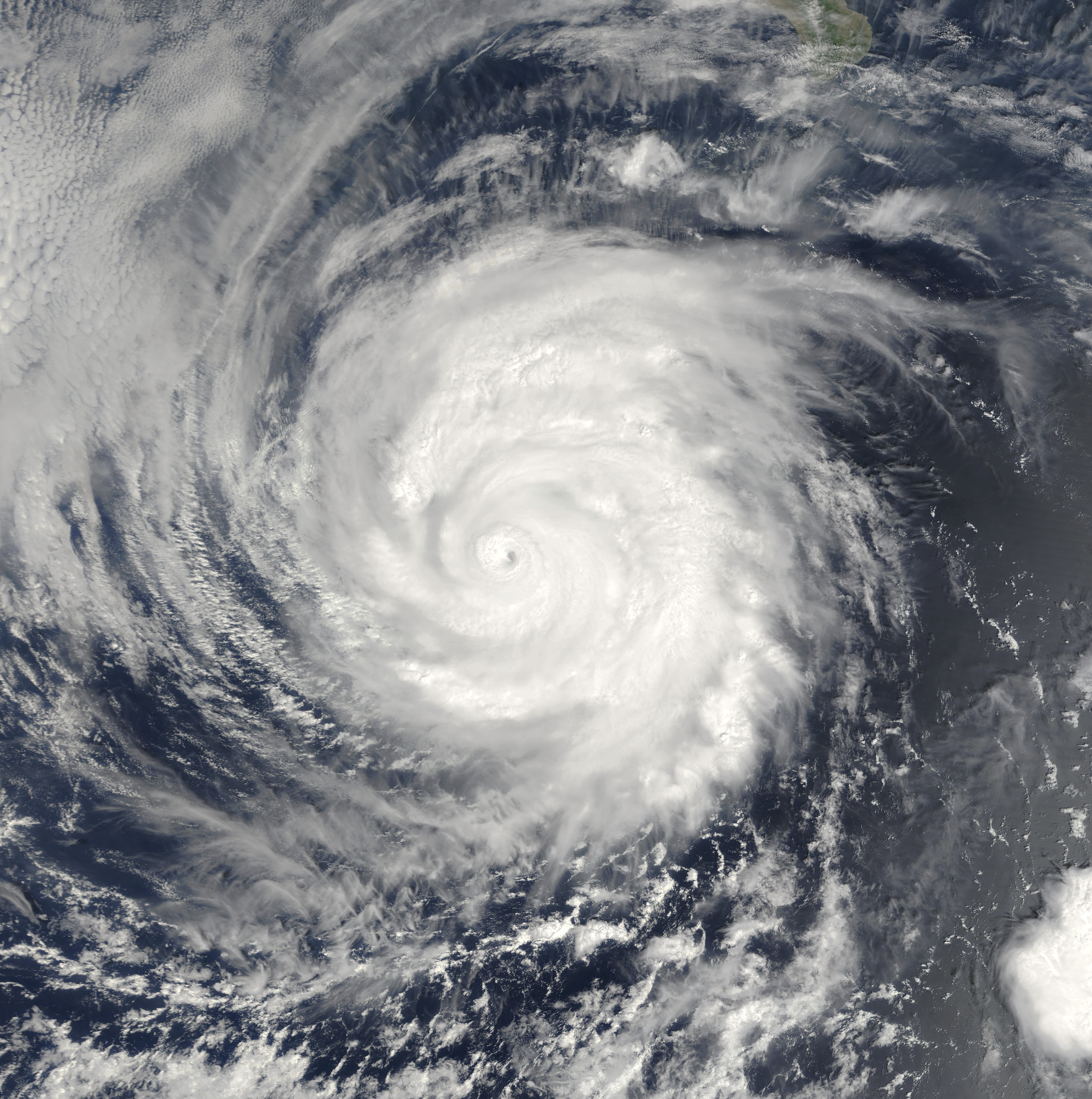
Hurricane Miriam shortly after peak strength on September 24

September 25

- 0600 UTC (11:00 p.m. PDT September 24) – Hurricane Miriam weakens to a Category 2 hurricane.
- 1800 UTC (11:00 a.m. PDT) – Hurricane Miriam weakens to a Category 1 hurricane about 685 mi (1,102 km) west of Manzanillo, Mexico.

September 26

- 0600 UTC (11:00 p.m. PDT September 25) – Hurricane Miriam weakens to a tropical storm.

September 27

- 1800 UTC (11:00 a.m. PDT) – Tropical Storm Miriam degenerates into a non-convective remnant area of low pressure roughly 435 mi (700 km) west-southwest of the southern tip of Baja California.

September 28

- 0600 UTC (11:00 p.m. PDT September 27) – Tropical Storm Norman develops from an area of low pressure about 115 mi (185 km) southeast of Cabo San Lucas, Mexico and simultaneously attains its peak intensity with maximum sustained winds of 50 mph (80 km/h) and a minimum barometric pressure of 997 mb (hPa; 29.44 inHg).

September 29

- 0500 UTC (10:00 p.m. PDT September 27) – Tropical Storm Norman weakens to a tropical depression and simultaneously makes landfall near Topolobampo, Mexico, with winds of 35 mph (56 km/h).
- 1200 UTC (5:00 a.m. PDT) – Tropical Depression Norman degenerates into a non-convective remnant area of low pressure about 80 mi (130 km) west-northwest of Los Mochis, Mexico.

=== October ===
October 6

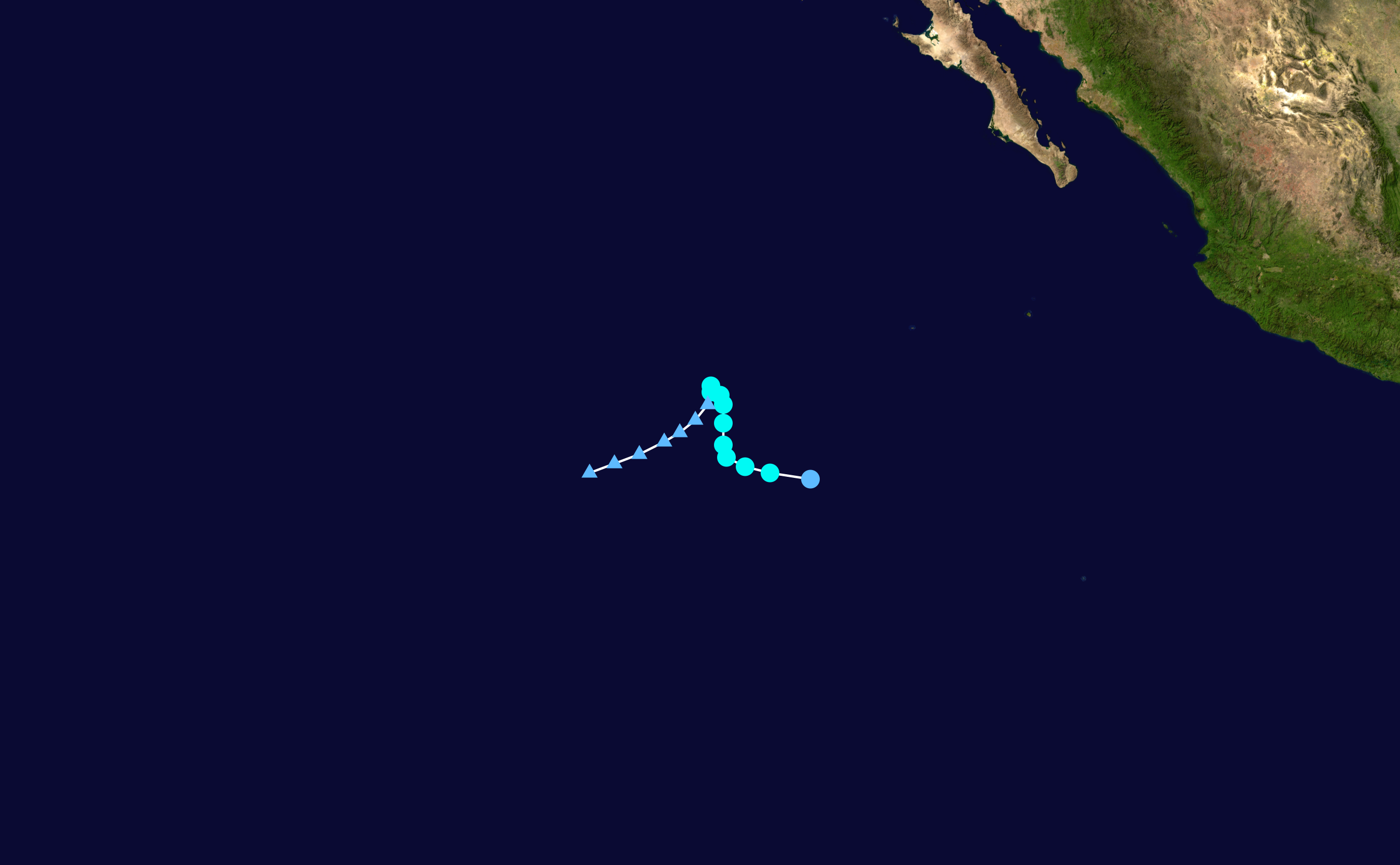
Storm path of Tropical Storm Olivia

- 1200 UTC (5:00 a.m. PDT) – Tropical Depression Fifteen-E develops from an area of low pressure roughly 860 mi (1,380 km) southwest of the southern tip of Baja California.
- 1800 UTC (11:00 a.m. PDT) – Tropical Depression Fifteen-E intensifies into Tropical Storm Olivia about 880 mi (1,420 km) southwest of the southern tip of Baja California.

October 7

- 1200 UTC (5:00 a.m. PDT) – Tropical Storm Olivia attains its peak intensity with maximum sustained winds of 60 mph (97 km/h) a minimum barometric pressure of 997 mb (hPa; 29.44 inHg).

October 9

- 0000 UTC (5:00 p.m. PDT October 8) – Tropical Storm Olivia degenerates into a non-convective remnant area of low pressure roughly 885 mi (1,424 km).

October 13

- 1200 UTC (5:00 a.m. PDT) – Tropical Depression Sixteen-E develops from an area of low pressure about 645 mi (1,038 km) south-southwest of Cabo San Lucas, Mexico.
- 1800 UTC (11:00 a.m. PDT) – Tropical Depression Sixteen-E intensifies into Tropical Storm Paul.

October 15

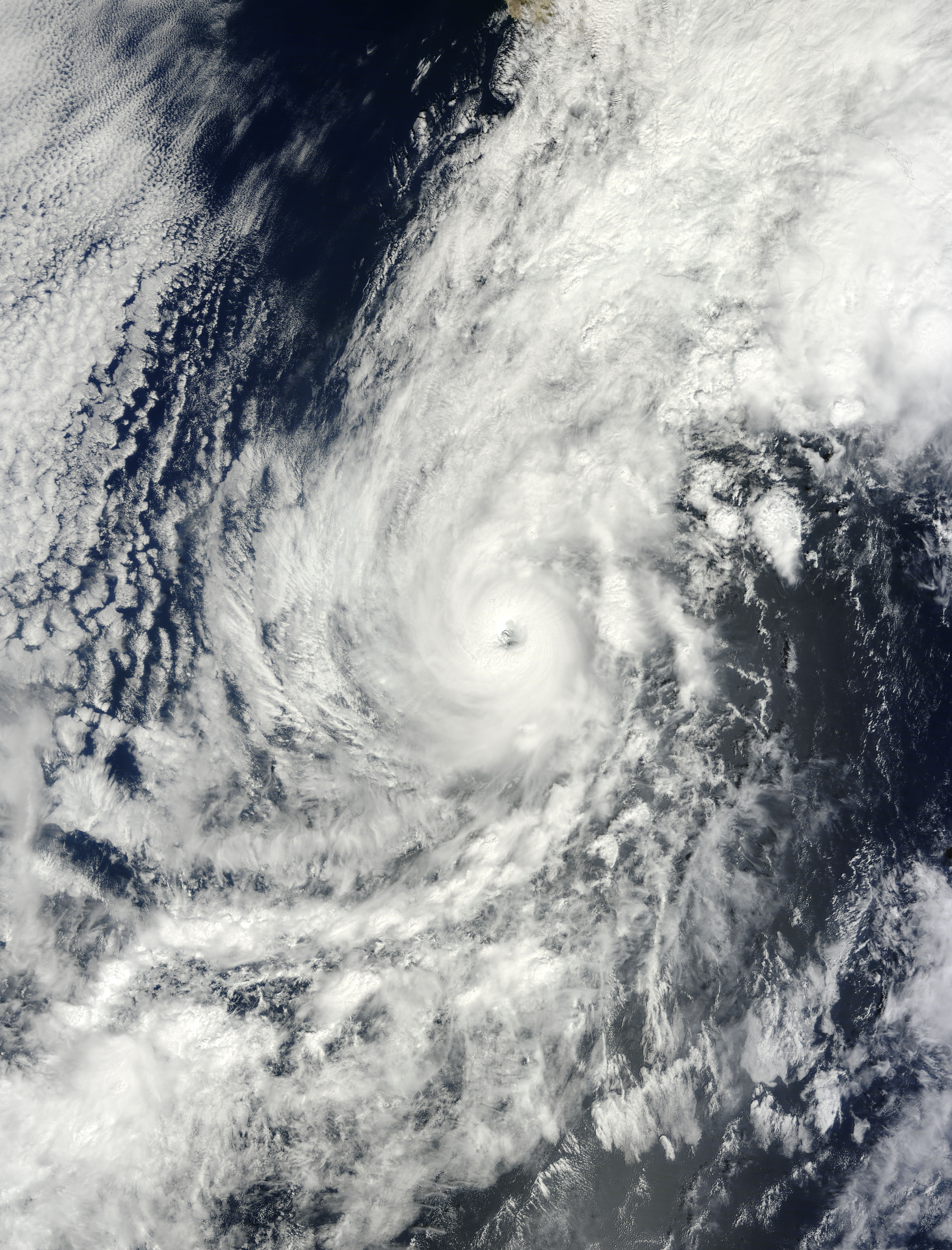
Paul as a major hurricane on October 15

- 0600 UTC (11:00 p.m. PDT October 14) – Tropical Storm Paul intensifies into a Category 1 hurricane roughly 595 mi (958 km) southwest of Cabo San Lucas, Mexico.
- 1800 UTC (11:00 a.m. PDT) – Hurricane Paul rapidly intensifies into a Category 3 hurricane and simultaneously attains its peak intensity with maximum sustained winds of 120 mph (190 km/h) and a minimum barometric pressure of 959 mb (hPa; 28.32 inHg).

October 16

- 1200 UTC (5:00 a.m. PDT) – Hurricane Paul weakens to a Category 2 hurricane.
- 1800 UTC (11:00 a.m. PDT) – Hurricane Paul weakens to a Category 1 hurricane about 40 mi (64 km) south-southwest of Cabo San Lazaro, Mexico.

October 17

- 0000 UTC (5:00 p.m. PDT October 16) – Hurricane Paul weakens to a tropical storm.
- 0600 UTC (11:00 p.m. PDT October 16) – Tropical Storm Paul degenerates into a non-convective remnant area of low pressure roughly 30 mi (48 km) northwest of Cabo San Lazaro, Mexico.

October 30

- 0600 UTC (11:00 p.m. PDT October 29) – Tropical Depression Seventeen-E develops from an area of low pressure about 700 mi (1,100 km) south-southwest of the southern tip of Baja California.
- 1200 UTC (5:00 a.m. PDT) – Tropical Depression Seventeen-E intensifies into Tropical Storm Rosa.

October 31

- 0600 UTC (11:00 p.m. PDT October 30) – Tropical Storm Rosa attains its peak intensity with maximum sustained winds of 50 mph (80 km/h) and a minimum barometric pressure of 1001 mb (hPa; 29.56 inHg).

=== November ===
November 3

- 1200 UTC (5:00 a.m. PDT) – Tropical Storm Rosa weakens to a tropical depression roughly 970 mi (1,560 km) southwest of the southern tip of Baja California.
- 1800 UTC (11:00 a.m. PDT) – Tropical Depression Rosa degenerates into a non-convective remnant area of low pressure about 990 mi (1,590 km) southwest of Cabo San Lucas, Mexico.

November 30

- The 2012 Pacific hurricane season officially ends.

== See also ==
- Timeline of the 2012 Atlantic hurricane season
- Timeline of the 2012 Pacific typhoon season
