= Timeline of the 2012 Pacific typhoon season =

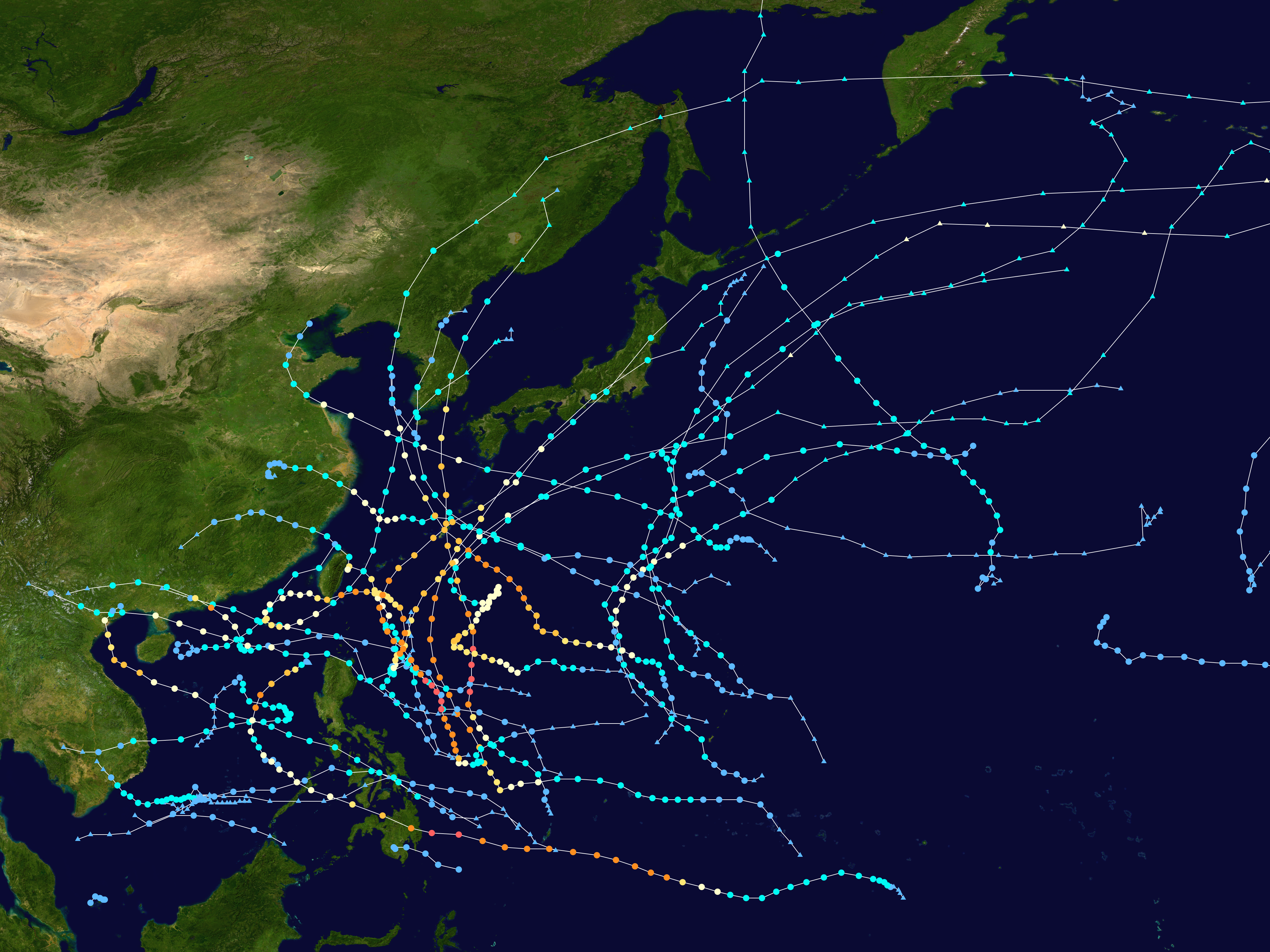
- Season summary map

Season boundaries
- First system formed: January 13, 2012
- Last system dissipated: December 29, 2012

Strongest system
- Name: Sanba
- Maximum winds: 205 km/h (125 mph) (10-minute sustained)
- Lowest pressure: 900 hPa (mbar)

Longest lasting system
- Name: Prapiroon
- Duration: 14 days
Storm articles
- Typhoon Guchol (2012)
- Tropical Storm Khanun (2012)
- Typhoon Vicente
- Typhoon Saola (2012)
- Typhoon Damrey (2012)
- Typhoon Haikui
- Typhoon Kai-tak (2012)
- Typhoon Tembin (2012)
- Typhoon Bolaven (2012)
- Typhoon Sanba
- Typhoon Jelawat (2012)
- Typhoon Son-Tinh
- Typhoon Bopha

This timeline documents all of the events of the 2012 Pacific typhoon season. The scope of this article is limited to the Pacific Ocean, north of the equator between 100°E and the International Date Line. During the season, 34 systems were designated as tropical depressions by either the Japan Meteorological Agency (JMA), the Philippine Atmospheric, Geophysical and Astronomical Services Administration (PAGASA), the Joint Typhoon Warning Center (JTWC), or other National Meteorological and Hydrological Services such as the China Meteorological Administration and the Hong Kong Observatory. Since the JMA runs the Regional Specialized Meteorological Centre (RSMC) for the Western Pacific, they assigned names to tropical depressions which developed into tropical storms in the basin. PAGASA also assigned local names to systems which are active in their area of responsibility; however, these names are not in common use outside of the Philippines.

For the PAGASA, 17 systems formed or entered in area of responsibility during 2012, which 7 of them directly made landfall over the Philippines. The season started by the formation of a depression on January 13, but the JMA reported that the season had started on January 1 by a tropical depression which formed on December 31, 2011. 7 typhoons underwent rapid deepening. From late August to September, three very powerful typhoons, Bolaven, Sanba and Jelawat, directly hit Okinawa Island successively. In October, the remnants of Severe Tropical Storm Gaemi arrived at the Bay of Bengal and re-intensified into a deep depression before making landfall over Bangladesh.

== Timeline of storms ==
=== January ===
January 1

- 0000 UTC - The 2012 Pacific typhoon season officially starts, as the same tropical depression which formed from December 31, 2011, reaches peak intensity.
- 0600 UTC - The JMA stops monitoring on the tropical depression.

January 13

- 0900 UTC - By the JMA, a non-tropical system formed and intensified to a tropical depression which was located several kilometers east of Kuala Lumpur, Malaysia.
- 2100 UTC - The tropical depression's circulation became exposed as it started to weaken.

January 14

- 0300 UTC - The system finally dissipated affecting Malaysia with heavy rainfall.

=== February ===
February 17

- 0300 UTC - A weak tropical disturbance forms 800 km (500 mi) to the southeast of Manila, Philippines and the JMA upgraded it to a tropical depression.
- 1500 UTC - The JTWC designates it as Tropical Depression 01W as it was upgraded to a tropical depression.
- 2100 UTC - The JTWC made its final advisories on 01W 6 hours after designating, due to an increasing vertical windshear.

February 20

- 0600 UTC - The JTWC classified 01W that it had already dissipated on February 17, but the JMA considered it to dissipate on February 20.

=== March ===
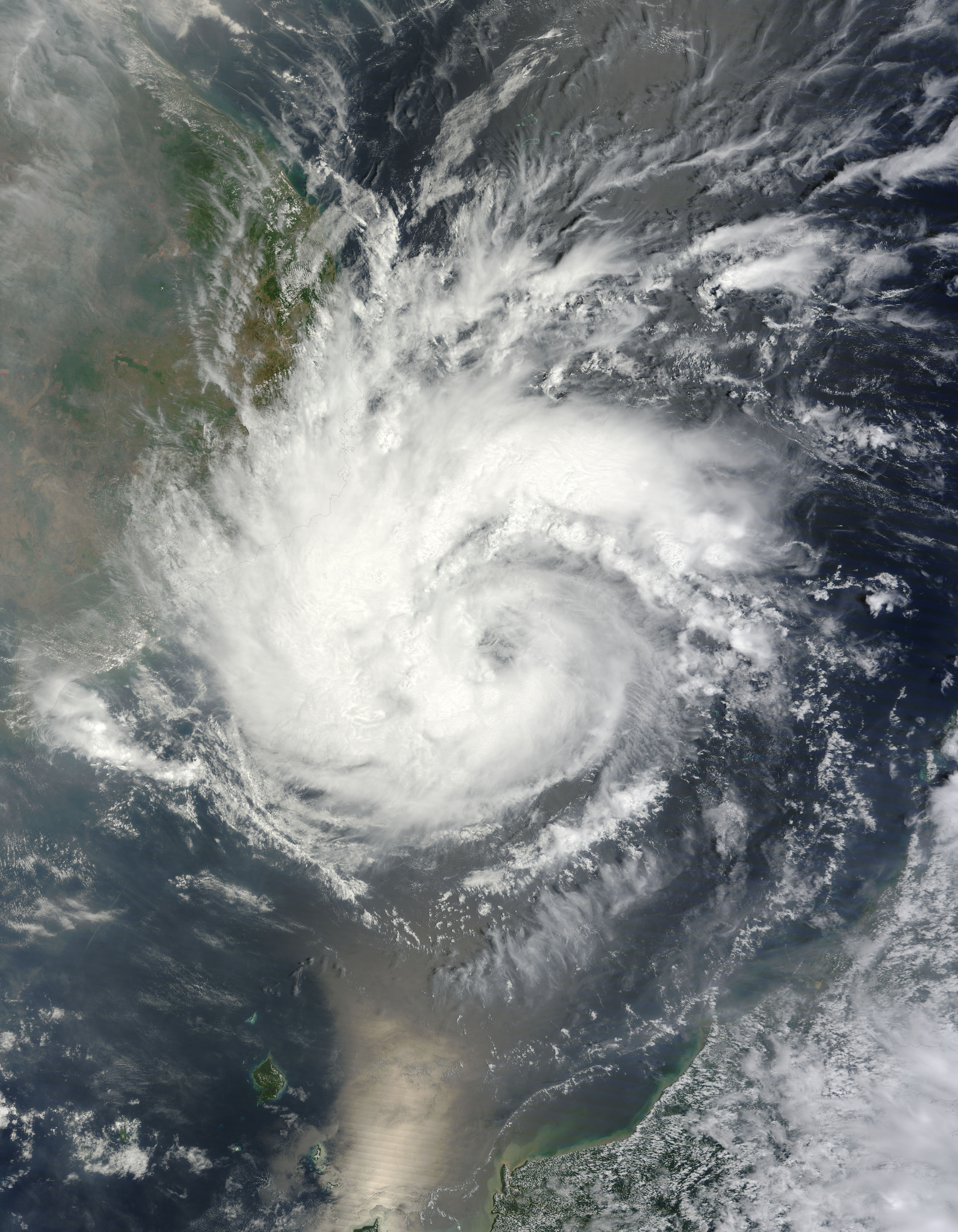
Pakhar at peak strength on March 30

There were no tropical updates during March 1–16.

March 17

- 1500 UTC - A tropical disturbance formed in the Philippine Sea and the PAGASA classified it as a low-pressure area.

March 19

- 2100 UTC - The LPA crosses the Philippines as it weakened slowly.

March 23

- 0300 UTC - The LPA intensifies again but it becomes a tropical disturbance.
- 1500 UTC - The weak disturbance enters a place of favorable conditions and warm waters to develop into a tropical storm.

March 24

- 0000 UTC - JMA considers the disturbance a tropical depression.
- 1800 UTC - Due to windshear, the depression's circulation weakened as the JMA downgraded it to a disturbance.

March 26

- 0300 UTC - The disturbance intensifies into a tropical depression again by the JMA.

March 28

- 0000 UTC - JTWC issues a TCFA Warning to the depression.
- 0600 UTC - The JTWC upgrades the depression to Tropical Depression 02W.
- 2100 UTC - Both the JMA and JTWC upgrades the depression as Tropical Storm Pakhar.

March 30

- 0900 UTC - Pakhar becomes a Category 1 typhoon by the JTWC as a ragged eye developed.
- 1800 UTC - Pakhar reaches peak intensity and weakens due to land reaction and colder sea-surface temperatures.

=== April ===
April 1

- 1200 UTC - Pakhar makes landfall in Vietnam.

April 2

- 0600 UTC - Both agencies rapidly downgrades Pakhar to a tropical depression.
- 1500 UTC - The remnants of Tropical Depression Pakhar finally dissipates.

=== May ===
May 20

- 0300 UTC - The JMA issues warning on a medium-sized tropical depression located 525 km (326 mi) southeast of Guam.
- 2100 UTC - JTWC had its first advisory on the depression, with the latter designating it as 03W.

May 22

- 0300 UTC - Both agencies upgraded the system to Tropical Storm Sanvu.

May 23

- 0600 UTC - JTWC upgraded Sanbu into a minimal typhoon as a small, ragged eye formed.
- 2100 UTC - Sanvu intensifies into a severe tropical storm as it heads in a northwest track.

May 27

- 0300 UTC - Both agencies made a warning that Sanvu had already weakened to a tropical storm, due to cool waters.
- 1800 UTC - The JTWC and JTWC made their final advisories on Sanvu as it becomes extratropical.

May 29

- 1500 UTC - The remnants of Sanvu had completely dissipated as it crosses the International Dateline.
  - - A disturbance forms northwest of Palau.

May 31

- 0300 UTC - JTWC issues a TCFA alert of the disturbance.
- 0900 UTC - With the PAGASA, it was classified as an LPA and was upgraded to Tropical Depression Ambo.
- 1200 UTC - The JMA and JTWC upgrades Ambo to a tropical depression, designating it as 04W.

=== June ===
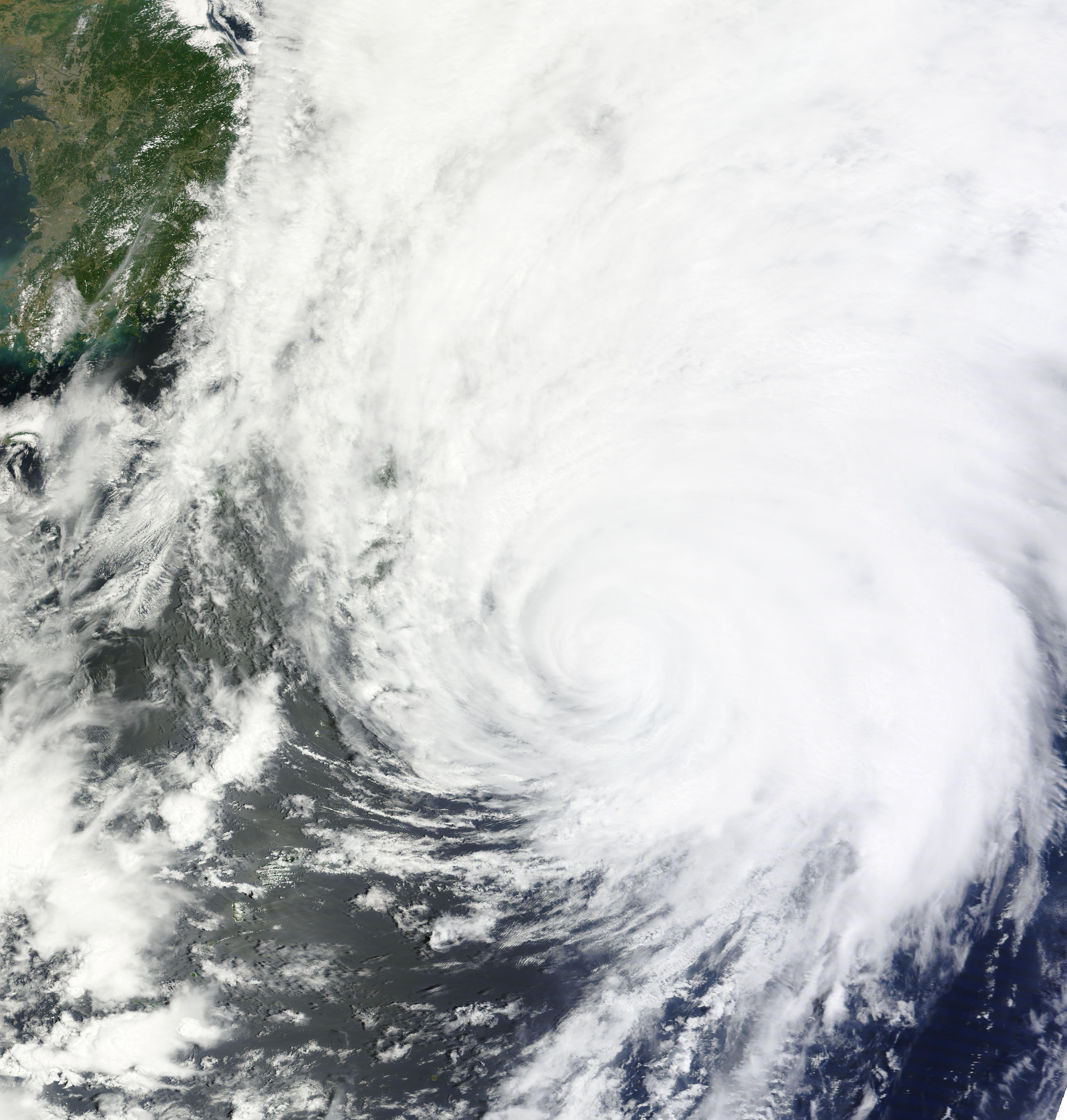
Guchol nearing landfall in Japan on June 19

June 1

- 0600 UTC - Due to strong convection wrapping Tropical Depression Ambo, the JMA classified 04W as Tropical Storm Mawar.

June 2

- 0900 UTC - Mawar becomes a severe tropical storm by the JMA.
- 1200 UTC - JTWC classifies Mawar as a Category 1 minimal typhoon.

June 3

- 0300 UTC - Severe Tropical Storm Mawar becomes a typhoon.
- 1200 UTC - Typhoon Mawar becomes a Category 2 typhoon.

June 4

- 0600 UTC - The JTWC upgrades Mawar as a Category 3 typhoon.
- 1500 UTC - Due to the subtropical jet stream, the JTWC downgrades Mawar back to a Category 2.

June 5

- 1500 UTC - Both agencies rapidly downgrades Mawar to a tropical storm and becomes extratropical.

June 8

- 0300 UTC - The remnants of Mawar finally dissipates.
- 1500 UTC - JTWC monitors a small, weak tropical disturbance located near Pohnpei.

June 11

- 0000 UTC - The JMA and JTWC upgrades it to Tropical Depression 05W as it slowly intensifies.
- 2100 UTC - 05W becomes a tropical storm by the JTWC, but not by the JMA and being named.

June 12

- 0600 UTC - JMA names it as Tropical Storm Guchol as it starts its rapid deepening phase.

June 14

- 0300 UTC - Guchol intensifies into a Severe Tropical Storm and a Category 1 typhoon, as it enters the PAR, naming it Butchoy.
- 1500 UTC - A tropical disturbance forms from the monsoonal trough east of Hainan, China.
- 1800 UTC - Guchol becomes a typhoon by the JMA.
- 2200 UTC - Typhoon Guchol becomes a Category 2 typhoon.

June 16

- 0900 UTC - JMA upgrades the disturbance to a tropical depression as it moves east slowly towards warm waters and favorable conditions.
- 1200 UTC - Typhoon Guchol becomes a Category 3 typhoon by the JTWC.
- 1500 UTC - Typhoon Guchol becomes a Category 4 typhoon by the JTWC.
  - - Guchol becomes a super typhoon by the JTWC as it reaches its peak intensity.

June 17

- 0900 UTC - Guchol weakens as it undergoes an eyewall replacement cycle and was classified as a Category 2 typhoon.
- 1200 UTC - The JTWC classifies the depression as 06W.
- 1500 UTC - Both the JMA and JTWC upgrades Tropical Depression 06W to Tropical Storm Talim.

June 19

- 0600 UTC - Both the JMA and JTWC classified Guchol as a tropical depression and finally dissipated.
- 1500 UTC - The JMA classified Talim as a severe tropical storm, but the JTWC didn't upgrade it to a Category 1 typhoon.

June 20

- 0600 UTC - PAGASA reports that Tropical Storm Talim entered the PAR, which gave the name Carina.
  - - In the same time, PAGASA monitors an LPA located inside the PAR.
- 1800 UTC - Talim has weakened to a tropical depression by both agencies.
- 2100 UTC - Tropical Depression Talim exits the PAR as it weakened to a remnant low.

June 22

- 0000 UTC - The low-pressure area of Talim affects Japan.

June 24

- 0300 UTC - The JTWC upgrades the LPA in the PAR, a tropical disturbance.

June 25

- 0900 UTC - The tropical disturbance becomes a tropical depression by the JMA.
- 1500 UTC - JTWC upgrades it as Tropical Depression 07W as PAGASA classified it as Tropical Depression Dindo.
- 1500 UTC - Dindo intensified to Tropical Storm Doksuri.
- 1800 UTC - With the JTWC, they did the same of upgrading it to a tropical storm.

June 28

- 1200 UTC - Due to an unusual circulation and a very exposed circulation, the JTWC downgrade the storm to a tropical depression.

June 29

- 0600 UTC - Doksuri makes landfall on Guangdong, China.

June 30

- 0900 UTC - The JMA made its last advisories on Doksuri as it weakened to an overland low.

=== July ===
July 14

- 0000 UTC - The JMA monitors a tropical depression which had split from an upper level low.
- 1800 UTC - JTWC issues a TCFA alert on the depression.
- 2100 UTC - JTWC made warnings on the depression and upgraded it to Tropical Depression 08W.

July 16

- 0300 UTC - The JMA upgrades 08W to a tropical storm, naming it Khanun.
  - - The JTWC also upgrades Khanun to a tropical storm.
- 0900 UTC - The JMA, JTWC and PAGASA monitors a small LPA, which split from upper level low of Khanun, becomes a tropical disturbance in the Philippine Sea.
- 1200 UTC - Khanun enters the corner of the Philippine area of Responsibility, with PAGASA naming it as Enteng.
- 2100 UTC - PAGASA makes its final update on Enteng as it exits the PAR.

July 17

- 1800 UTC - Khanun intensifies into a severe tropical storm.
- 2100 UTC - The disturbance moves west rapidly as it gathers strength over northern Luzon, Philippines.

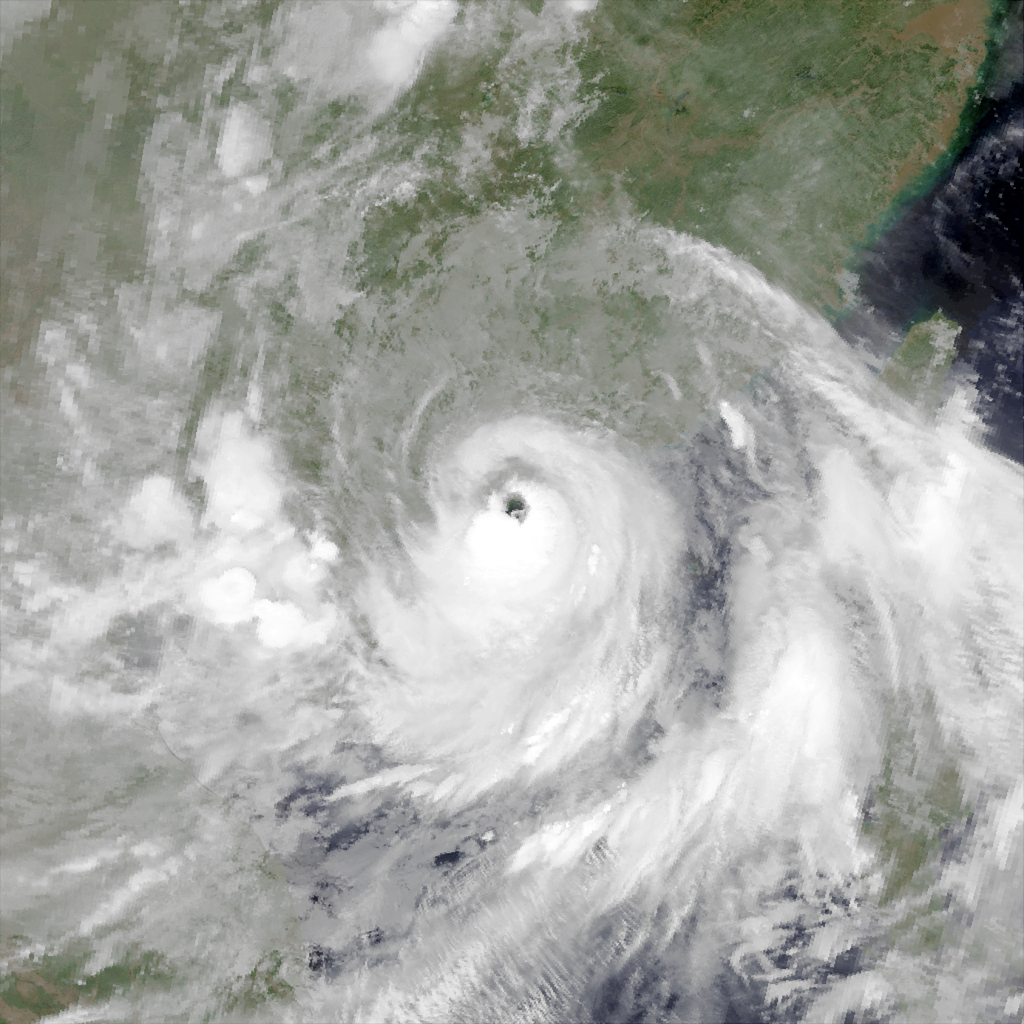
Typhoon Vicente at its peak strength on July 23

July 18

- 0600 UTC - The disturbance was upgraded to a minor tropical depression by the JMA.
- 1200 UTC - Khanun weakens as it makes landfall over South Korea.
- 2100 UTC - Both the JMA and JTWC downgrades Khanun to a tropical depression.

July 19

- 0300 UTC - The remnants of Khanun dissipates.

July 20

- 0000 UTC - The JTWC issues a TCFA alert on the depression.
- 0300 UTC - The PAGASA classifies the depression as an Active Low Pressure Area (ALPA).
- 1200 UTC - Both the PAGASA and JTWC classifies it as a tropical depression, with PAGASA naming it as Ferdie and JTWC designating it as 09W.

July 21

- 0900 UTC - JMA upgrades Ferdie to Tropical Storm Vicente as it pushes north towards warmer waters.
- 1500 UTC - JTWC classifies Vicente as a tropical storm, so did the PAGASA.
- 1800 UTC - Due to strong convection and monsoon, Vicente starts its rapid intensification as it becomes a severe tropical storm.

July 23

- 0300 UTC - With low vertical windshear and drier air outflow, Vicente explosively becomes a Category 1 typhoon.
- 0900 UTC - Typhoon Vicente exits the PAR as it kills 2 people due to heavy flooding in the Philippines.
- 1300 UTC - JTWC classifies Vicente as a Category 3 typhoon.
- 1500 UTC - Typhoon Vicente reaches its peak intensity as a Category 4 typhoon, but JTWC didn't classified it as a super typhoon, due to land reaction.
- 2100 UTC - Typhoon Vicente rapidly weakens to a Category 2/1 typhoon.

July 24

- 0900 UTC - Vicente rapidly weakens to a tropical storm as it affects southern China.
- 1500 UTC - JTWC downgrades Vicente to a tropical depression.

July 26

- 0000 UTC - Tropical Depression Vicente rapidly weakens to a LPA.
- 0300 UTC - JTWC monitors a tropical disturbance located east of Visayas, Philippines and issues a TCFA.
  - - Same with the PAGASA, they classified it as an ALPA.
- 0900 UTC - PAGASA rapidly upgrades it to a tropical storm, naming it Gener.
- 1200 UTC - Gener intensifies to Tropical Storm Saola.
  - - In the same time, JTWC assigns Saola as Tropical Depression 10W, and rapidly a tropical storm.

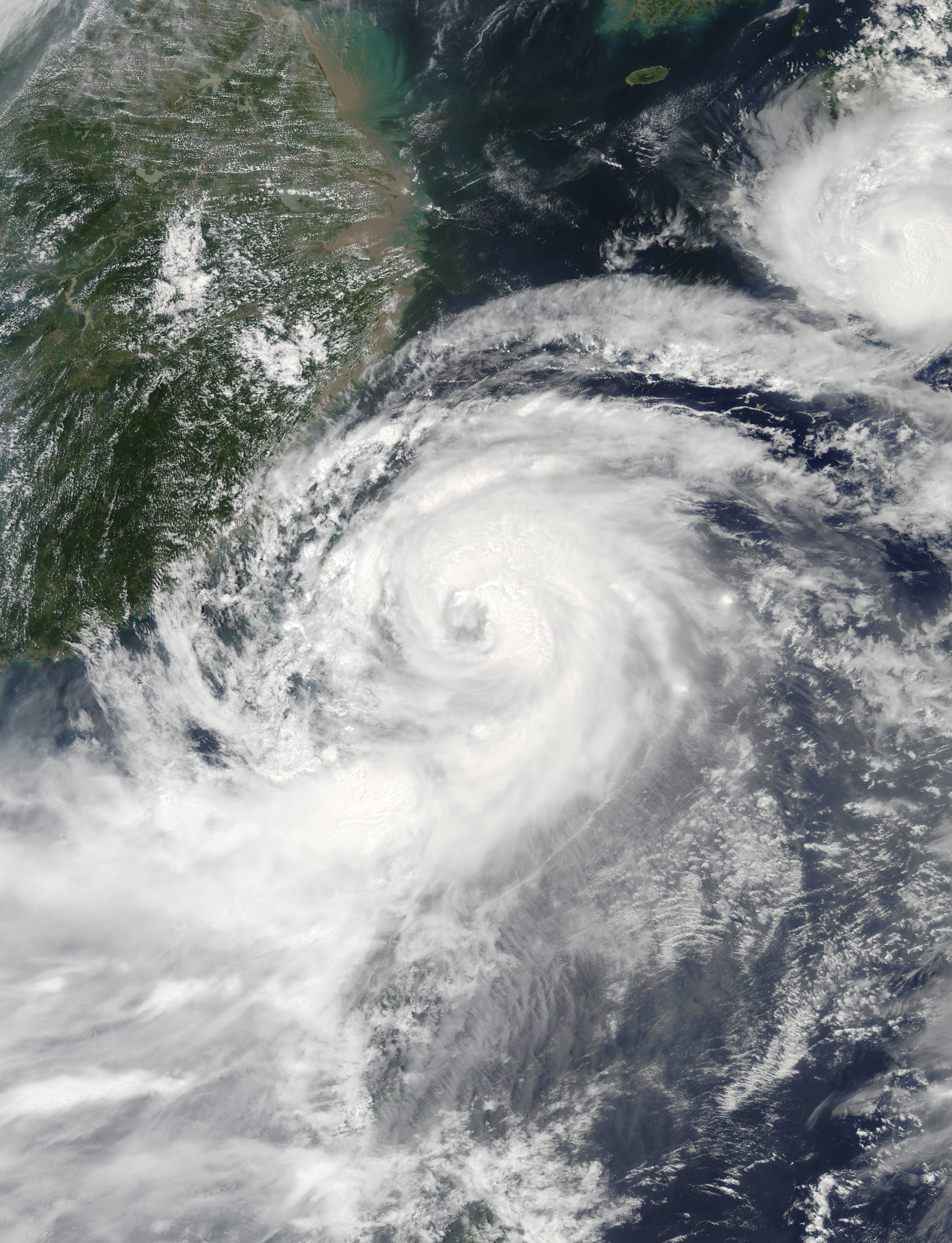
Typhoon Saola and Damrey at peak intensity on August 1

July 27

- 0300 UTC - JMA monitors another tropical depression, which formed from a cold-core low located southwest of Minamitorishima.
- 0900 UTC - The JTWC classifies it as a tropical disturbance.

July 29

- 0000 UTC - Both the JMA and JTWC upgrades the depression to Tropical Storm Damrey.
- 0300 UTC - Saola intensifies into a severe tropical storm.

July 30

- 0600 UTC - JTWC classifies Saola as a Category 1 typhoon. In that same time, JMA reports that Saola had intensified into a typhoon, as an eye developed.
- 0900 UTC - Due to the strong outflows from Typhoon Saola, Severe Tropical Storm Damrey and moisture of the southwest monsoon, a large tropical disturbance forms in the Pacific Ocean and the JTWC issues a TCFA.
- 1800 UTC - Due to warm waters, Damrey intensified into a severe tropical storm and the JTWC classified it as a Category 1 storm.
- 2100 UTC - Damrey reaches typhoon strength.

=== August ===
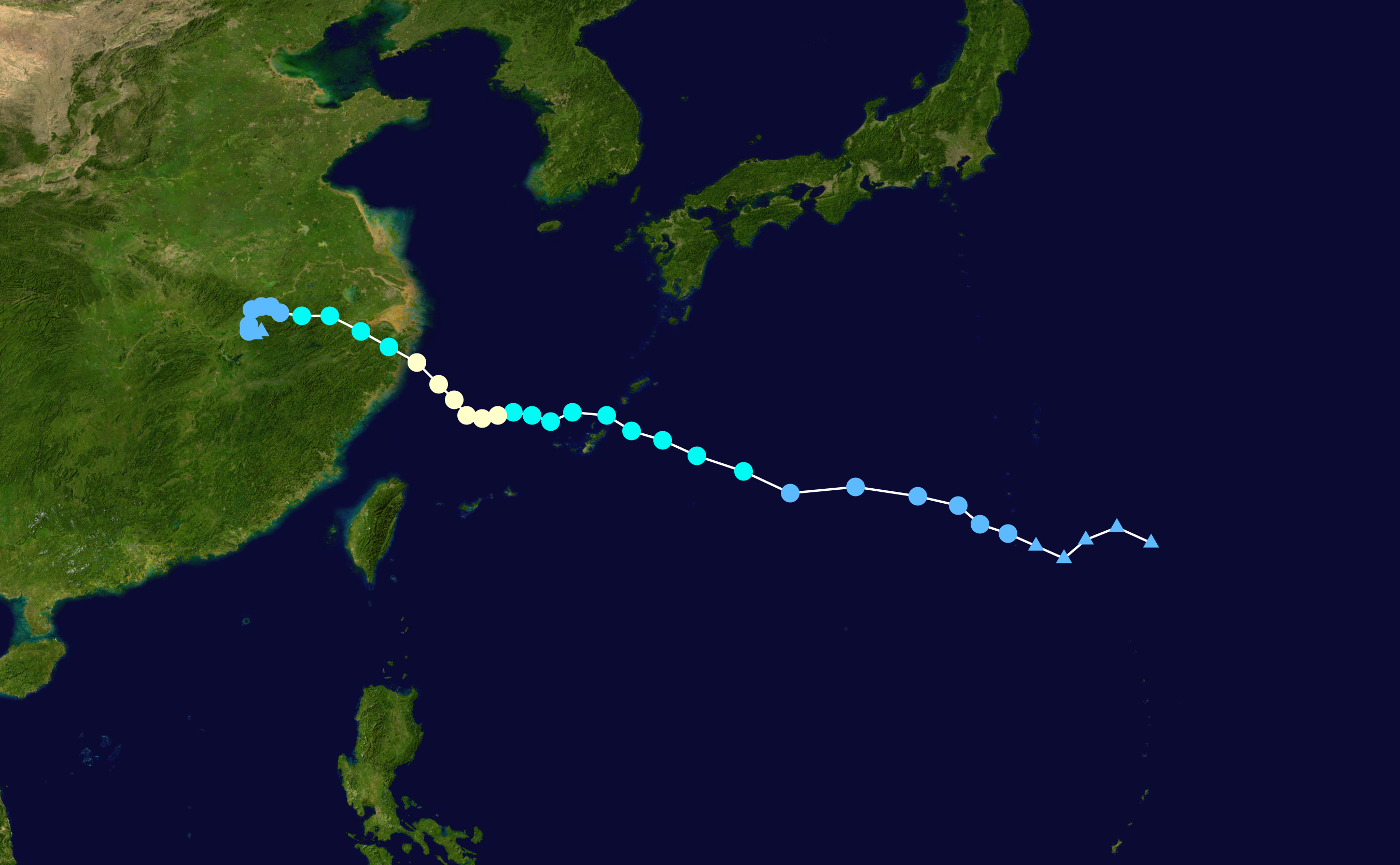
Track of Haikui in early-August

August 1

- 0600 UTC - The large tropical disturbance intensifies into a tropical depression by the JMA.
- 0900 UTC - Typhoon Saola enhances the southwest monsoon, bringing heavy floods to the Philippines, killing a total of 53.
  - - Damrey intensifies to a typhoon, as it developed a small, well-defined eye.
- 1200 UTC - Damrey rapidly weakens as it makes landfall over Jiangsi, China.

August 2

- 0300 UTC - JTWC issues its first warning on the newly formed tropical depression, designated it as 12W.

August 3

- 0000 UTC - Due to low vertical windshear and increasing convection, it intensified into Tropical Storm Haikui by the JMA.
- 0600 UTC - A tropical depression forms from the outflow of Severe Tropical Storm Haikui northwest of Wake Island.
- 1800 UTC - JTWC upgrades Haikui to a storm.
- 2100 UTC - Saola and Damrey has its last advisories from JMA and JTWC.

August 5

- 0000 UTC - Haikui intensifies to a severe tropical storm and the JTWC upgrades it to a minimal typhoon.
- 1200 UTC - JTWC starts to issue warnings on Tropical Depression 13W.
- 1800 UTC - Tropical Depression 13W becomes a tropical storm by the JTWC.

August 7

- 0600 UTC - 13W intensifies to a tropical storm, with the JMA naming it as Kirogi.
- 1200 UTC - The JMA upgraded Haikui to a typhoon, as it enhances the southwest monsoon, bringing heavy rainfall to the Philippines, just like Typhoon Saola 2 weeks prior.

August 9

- 0900 UTC - The JTWC made its final advisories on Kirogi.
- 1200 UTC - Kirogi weakens to a tropical storm as it starts to enter cool waters.
- 1500 UTC - Haikui weakens to a tropical storm over northeastern China.
- 1800 UTC - A tropical disturbance forms from the monsoonal trough.

August 11

- 0000 UTC - Kirogi's remnants entered the Sea of Okhotsk.
- 0900 UTC - PAGASA classifies it as a LPA.
- 2100 UTC - The disturbance intensifies into a weak tropical depression.

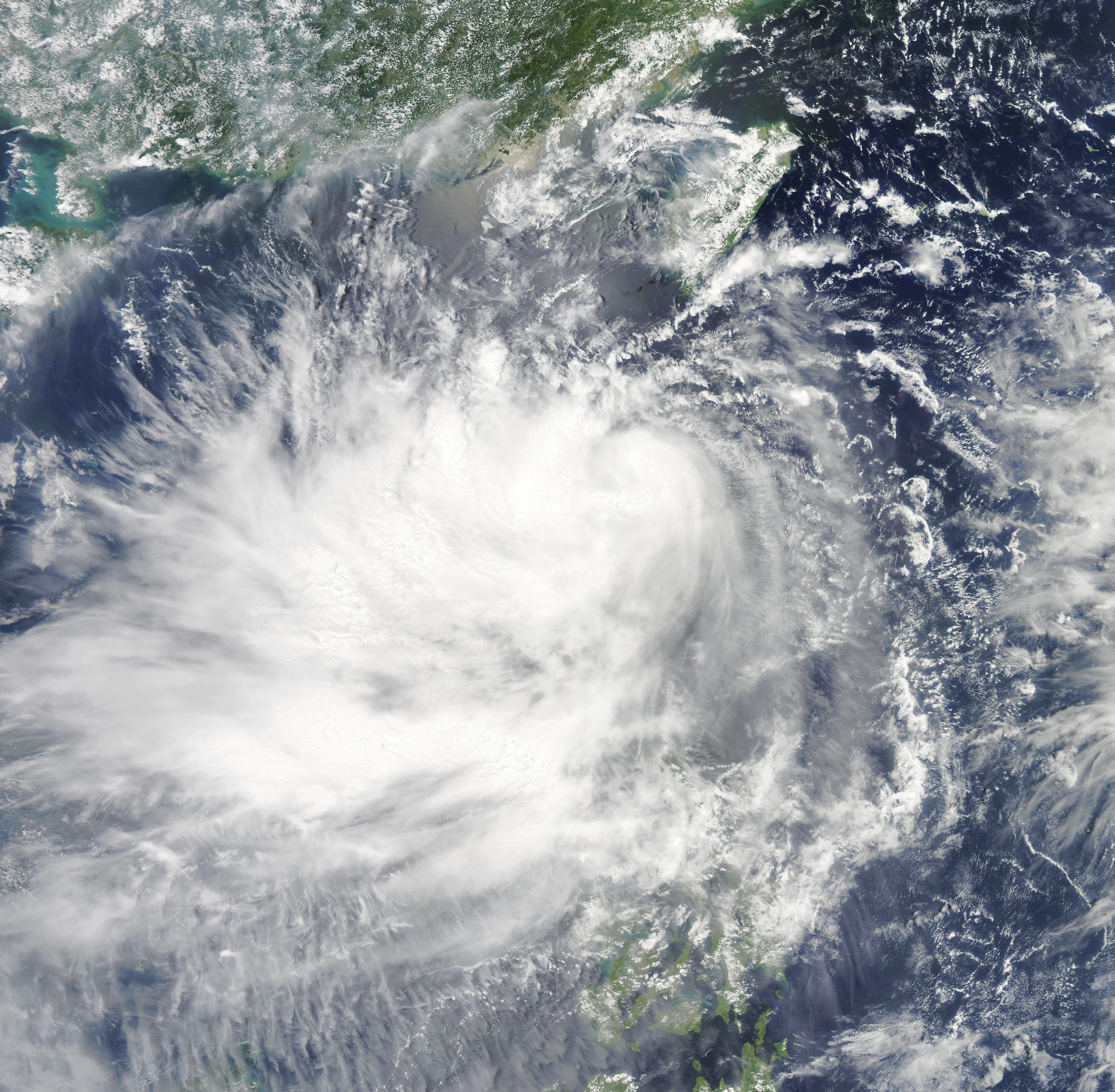
Tropical Storm Kai-Tak affecting Luzon as a tropical storm on August 15

August 12

- 0000 UTC - PAGASA upgrades it to an active low-pressure area.
- 1500 UTC - PAGASA reports that the ALPA had intensified into a tropical depression, naming it as Helen.
- 1800 UTC - Tropical Depression Helen was designated as Tropical Depression 14W by the JTWC, as it gathers more strength.

August 13

- 0300 UTC - JMA upgrades Helen to Tropical Storm Kai-Tak.
- 1200 UTC - JTWC and PAGASA upgrades Kai-Tak to a tropical storm.
- 1800 UTC - Tropical Storm Kai-Tak intensifies to a severe tropical storm.

August 15

- 0600 UTC - Due to strong convection over Kai-Tak, the JTWC upgraded it to a typhoon.
- 1800 UTC - An area of convection occurred east of Aurora, Philippines.
- 2100 UTC - That area spawned a strong tropical disturbance located over an area of warm waters and favorable conditions.

August 16

- 0000 UTC - Kai-Tak intensifies into a typhoon by the JMA, as it leaves the PAR with PAGASA making the final warning on Helen.
- 0900 UTC - The JMA upgrades the disturbance to a tropical depression, which is now located southeast of Taiwan.

August 17

- 0600 UTC - JMA upgrades it to a tropical depression.
- 1200 UTC - The JTWC downgrades Kai-Tak to a tropical storm and made its final warning.
- 1500 UTC - Another area of convection spawned a tropical disturbance.
- 2100 UTC - Kai-Tak weakens to a tropical depression.

August 19

- 0000 UTC - Kai-Tak finally dissipates overland.
- 0300 UTC - Tembin makes PAGASA to have its first warning, giving the name Igme.
  - - The disturbance rapidly intensifies into a depression.
- 0600 UTC - Igme rapidly becomes Tropical Depression 15W, as JMA upgrades it to Tropical Storm Tembin.
- 0900 UTC - The depression rapidly intensifies into Tropical Depression 16W.
- 1800 UTC - 16W grew larger in size as it intensifies into Tropical Storm Bolaven.

August 20

- 0000 UTC - Tembin starts its period of explosive intensification as both agencies upgrade it to a typhoon, and PAGASA later that day.
- 0900 UTC - Bolaven becomes a severe tropical storm and a typhoon by the JTWC.
- 2100 UTC - Severe Tropical Storm Bolaven becomes a typhoon. Same with Typhoon Tembin, Bolaven undergoes explosive intensification.

August 22

- 0300 UTC - Tembin undergoes an eyewall replacement cycle as it weakened to a Category 1 typhoon.
- 2100 UTC - Tembin intensifies again to a Category 2 typhoon.

August 23

- 0000 UTC - Again, Tembin undergoes a rapid deepening phase as it becomes a Category 3 typhoon

August 25

- 0000 UTC - JMA and JTWC downgrades Tembin to a tropical storm, due to minor land reaction with Taiwan.
- 1800 UTC - Bolaven slowly weakens as it passes through the island of Okinawa.
  - - In that same time, Tembin entered the south China sea and both agencies upgraded Tembin to a typhoon again.

August 26

- 0000 UTC - Tembin reaches a Category 3 typhoon and held its intensity as it curved the otherway towards the east, due to the fujiwhara effect from Typhoon Bolaven several miles northeast of it.
- 0900 UTC - JMA downgrades Bolaven to a severe tropical strength.

August 28

- 0300 UTC - Bolaven makes landfall towards Korea and becomes extratropical.

=== September ===
September 9

- 0300 UTC - A low-pressure area formed east of Palau.
- 1500 UTC - It becomes a tropical disturbance by the JTWC.

September 10

- 0600 UTC - Both the JMA and JTWC made its first official warning on newly formed Tropical Depression 17W.
- 2100 UTC - 17W enters the PAR as it was named as Karen.

September 11

- 0000 UTC - Karen becomes Tropical Storm Sanba.
- 0600 UTC - JTWC finally upgrades Sanba to a tropical storm.
- 2100 UTC - JMA upgrades Sanba to a severe tropical storm.

September 13

- 0000 UTC - Sanba intensifies into a typhoon, as it starts to undergo rapid deepening, as it moves in a northward direction.
- 0600 UTC - With the JTWC, they had reported that Sanba became a Category 4 super typhoon.
- 1200 UTC - Super Typhoon Sanba becomes the first Category 5 typhoon of the season.
- 1500 UTC - Sanba starts to weaken as it heads in a north northeast direction towards Korea.

September 15

- 0000 UTC - Sanba rapidly weakens to a Category 3 typhoon, as it starts to form an eyewall replacement cycle

September 17

- 0000 UTC - JMA and JTWC downgrades Sanba to a severe tropical storm, as it makes landfall over Korea.
- 0900 UTC - Both agencies soon downgrades Sanba to a tropical storm.
- 1800 UTC - A tropical disturbance forms near Guam.

September 18

- 0000 UTC - Tropical Depression Sanba becomes extratropical.

September 20

- 0300 UTC - JMA upgrades the disturbance to a tropical depression.
  - - The JTWC classifies a TCFA on the system.
- 0900 UTC - PAGASA makes its first warnings on the depression. With that, they named it as Tropical Depression Lawin.
- 1200 UTC - JTWC also classifies it as Tropical Depression 18W.
- 1800 UTC - Lawin intensifies into Tropical Storm Jelawat by the JMA and JTWC.

September 21

- 0600 UTC - Jelawat intensifies into a severe tropical storm.

September 23

- 0000 UTC - JTWC upgrades the storm into a minimal typhoon.
  - - A non-tropical system gradually intensified into a tropical disturbance out of the Intertropical Convergence Zone.
- 0300 UTC - Jelawat intensifies into Typhoon Jelawat.
- 1800 UTC - Due to warm sea surface temperatures to the disturbance, it became Tropical Depression 19W from both agencies.

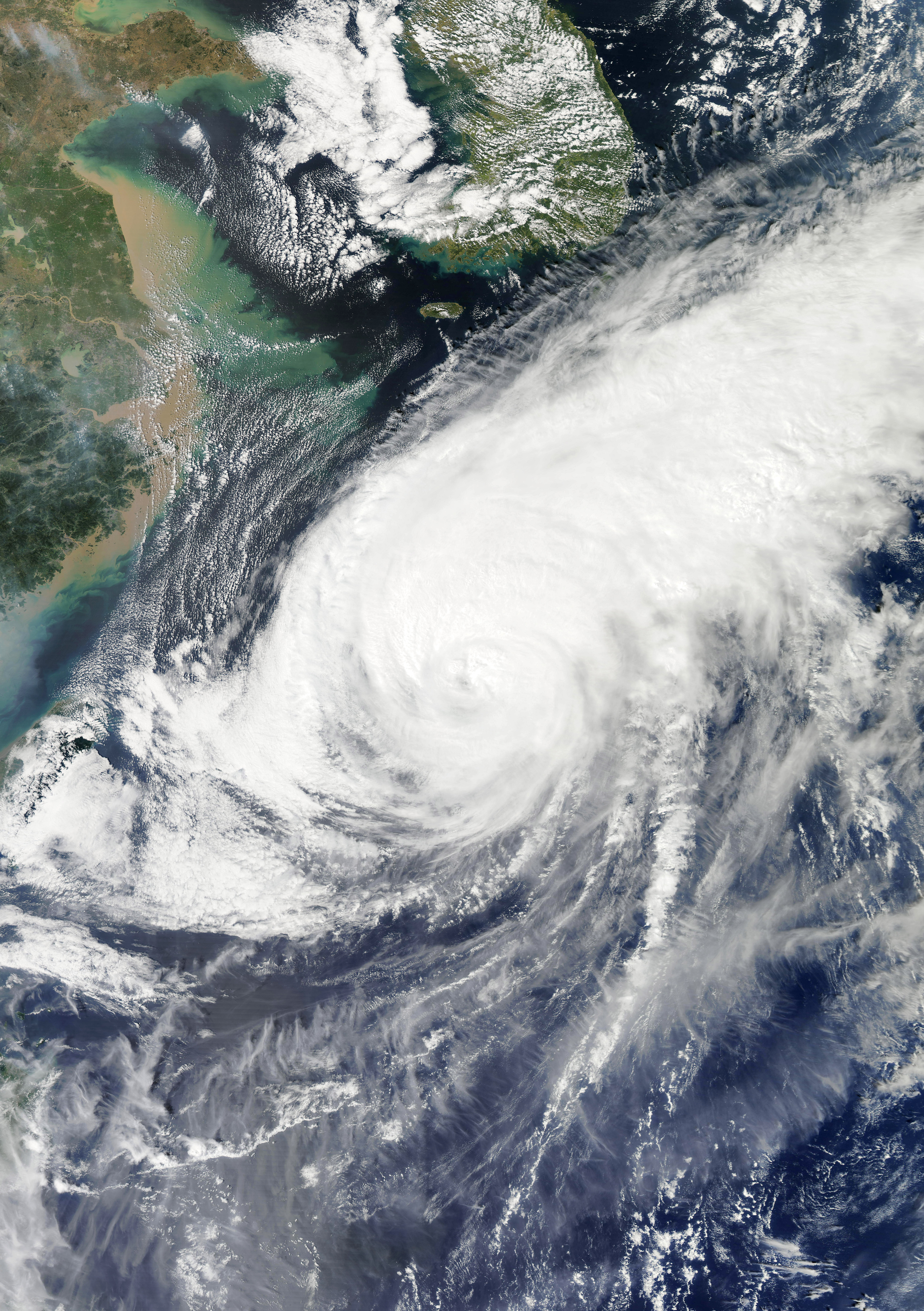
Typhoon Jelawat weakening over Okinawa on September 29

September 25

- 0000 UTC - 19W intensifies into Tropical Storm Ewiniar.
- 0300 UTC - Due to the start of rapid deepening of Jelawat on September 23, JTWC classified it as a Category 5 super typhoon.
- 0600 UTC - Jelawat reaches peak strength, without beating the intensity of Typhoon Sanba.

September 27

- 0000 UTC - JTWC downgrades Jelawat from a Category 4 super typhoon to a Category 3 typhoon.
- 0600 UTC - JMA upgrades Ewiniar to a severe tropical storm.
- 1500 UTC - Similar to the formation of Ewiniar, another disturbance rapidly forms near Chuuk.

September 28

- 0300 UTC - Ewiniar finally weakens due to the jet stream, northern outflow of Jelawat and cooler waters.
- 0600 UTC - Jelawat affects Taiwan.

September 29

- 0900 UTC - Typhoon Jelawat weakens further to a severe tropical storm as it affects the Ryukyu Islands.
- 1200 UTC - Ewiniar's circulation becomes exposed.
  - - The disturbance intensifies into a tropical depression as it grew larger in size.
    - - Another tropical depression forms in the South China Sea.

September 30

- 0900 UTC Jelawat finally weakens to a tropical storm, with JMA and JTWC making their final advisory as it makes landfall over Japan.
  - - Ewiniar becomes extratropical.

=== October ===
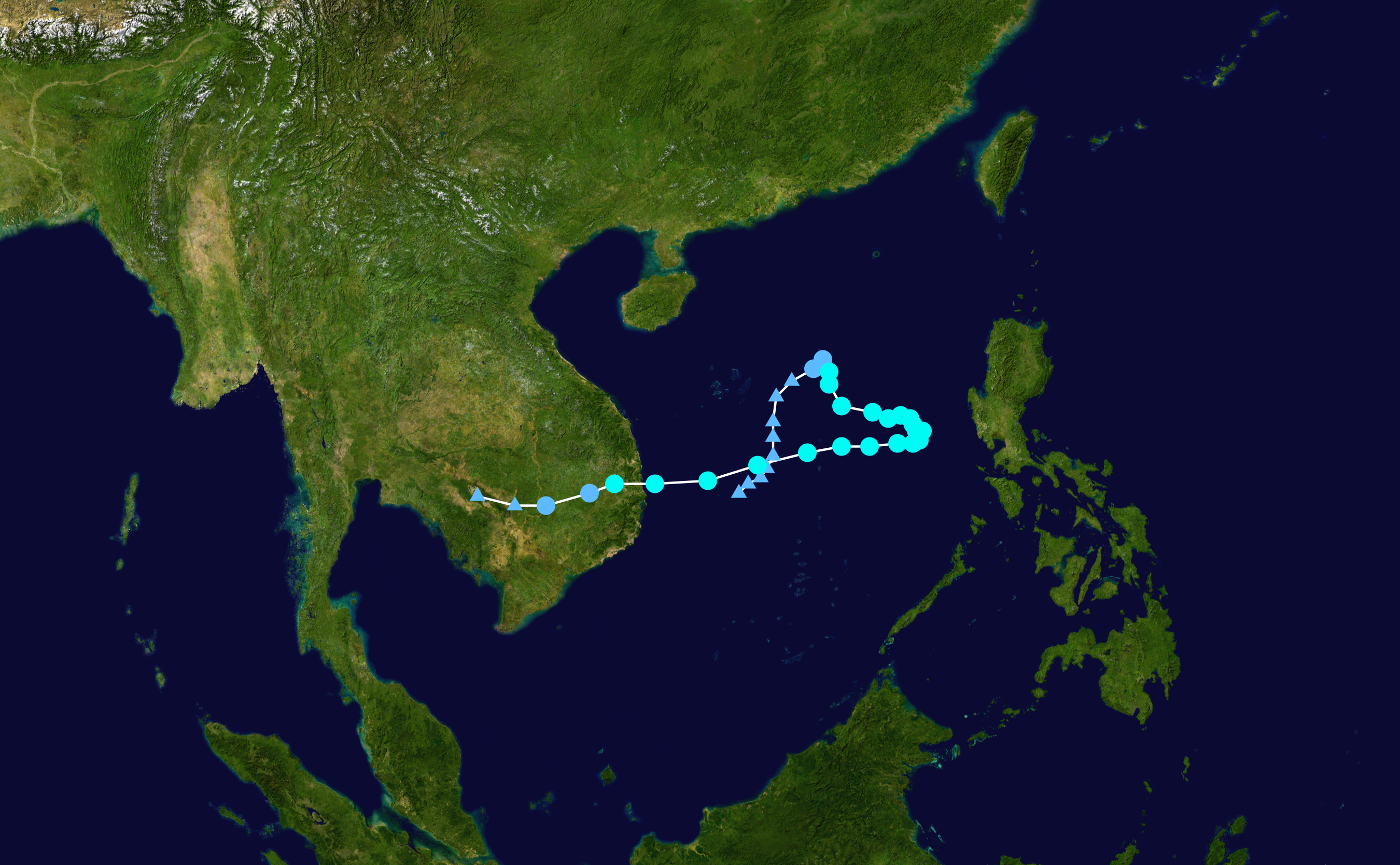
Track of Gaemi during early-October

October 1

- 0900 UTC - Tropical Depression 20W intensifies into Tropical Storm Maliksi.
- 1200 UTC - Tropical Depression 21W intensifies into Tropical Storm Gaemi.

October 3

- 0300 UTC - JMA upgrades Gaemi to a severe tropical storm.
- 0900 UTC - Gaemi enters the PAR, with PAGASA naming it Marce.
  - - Maliksi strengthens into a severe tropical storm.

October 4

- 0600 UTC - Due to unfavorable conditions to Maliksi, JTWC makes its final warnings as it becomes extratropical.
- 0900 UTC - Gaemi starts to weaken, as its circulation becomes exposed and moves in a westerly direction.
- 1500 UTC - JMA stops issuing warnings on Maliksi.

October 6

- 0000 UTC - JTWC upgrades a new tropical depression from the ITCZ, designating it as 22W.
- 1200 UTC - Tropical Storm Gaemi makes landfall over Vietnam
- 1500 UTC - The remnant low of Maliksi crosses the International Dateline, and in the same time, it finally dissipated.

October 7

- 0000 UTC - JTWC classifies the system as 22W.
- 0300 UTC - 22W intensifies into Tropical Storm Prapiroon.
- 0600 UTC - Just nearly the same time after it was named, PAGASA names this as Tropical Storm Nina.

October 9

- 0300 UTC - Prapidoon intensifies into a category 1 typhoon.

October 10

- 2100 UTC - JTWC upgrades Prapiroon to a category 2 typhoon.

October 12

- 0000 UTC - Tropical Depression 23W forms northeast of Guam.
- 0600 UTC - Prapiroon rapidly intensifies into a strong category 3 storm, with that it reached its maximum intensity.

October 14

- 0900 UTC - Both the JMA and JTWC upgrades 23W to Tropical Storm Maria.

October 15

- 0300 UTC - Due to deep convection, Maria intensifies into a severe tropical storm.
- 0600 UTC - Due to an anticyclone north of Prapiroon, the typhoon starts to make a small loop, and with this, JTWC downgrades it to a minimal typhoon.

October 16

- 0300 UTC - Prapiroon's eye becomes very displaced.
- 1500 UTC - The southern periphery of Prapiroon becomes strong.

October 19

- 0300 UTC - Both the systems made their final advisory on Prapiroon.
- 0600 UTC - Prapidoon transitions to an extratropical cyclone.
- 1500 UTC - A tropical disturbance forms near Yap.

October 20

- 0000 UTC - Maria fully dissipates.
- 0900 UTC - The disturbance starts to intensify and PAGASA calls this a low-pressure area.

October 21

- 0000 UTC - JMA upgrades the LPA to a tropical depression.
- 1200 UTC - The depression starts to intensify as JTWC monitors it but classifies it as a disturbance.

October 22

- 0300 UTC - PAGASA upgrades the LPA to a tropical depression too and named it Ofel.
- 0600 UTC - JTWC designates Ofel to Tropical Depression 24W.

October 24

- 0000 UTC - All agencies upgrades it to a tropical storm, receiving the name Son-Tinh.
  - - In the same time, it made landfall over Leyte.

October 25

- 0000 UTC - Son-Tinh enters the South China Sea.

October 27

- 0300 UTC - Son-Tinh rapidly intensifies into a typhoon by both agencies.
- 0600 UTC - Son-Tinh reaches peak intensity as a category 3 storm.

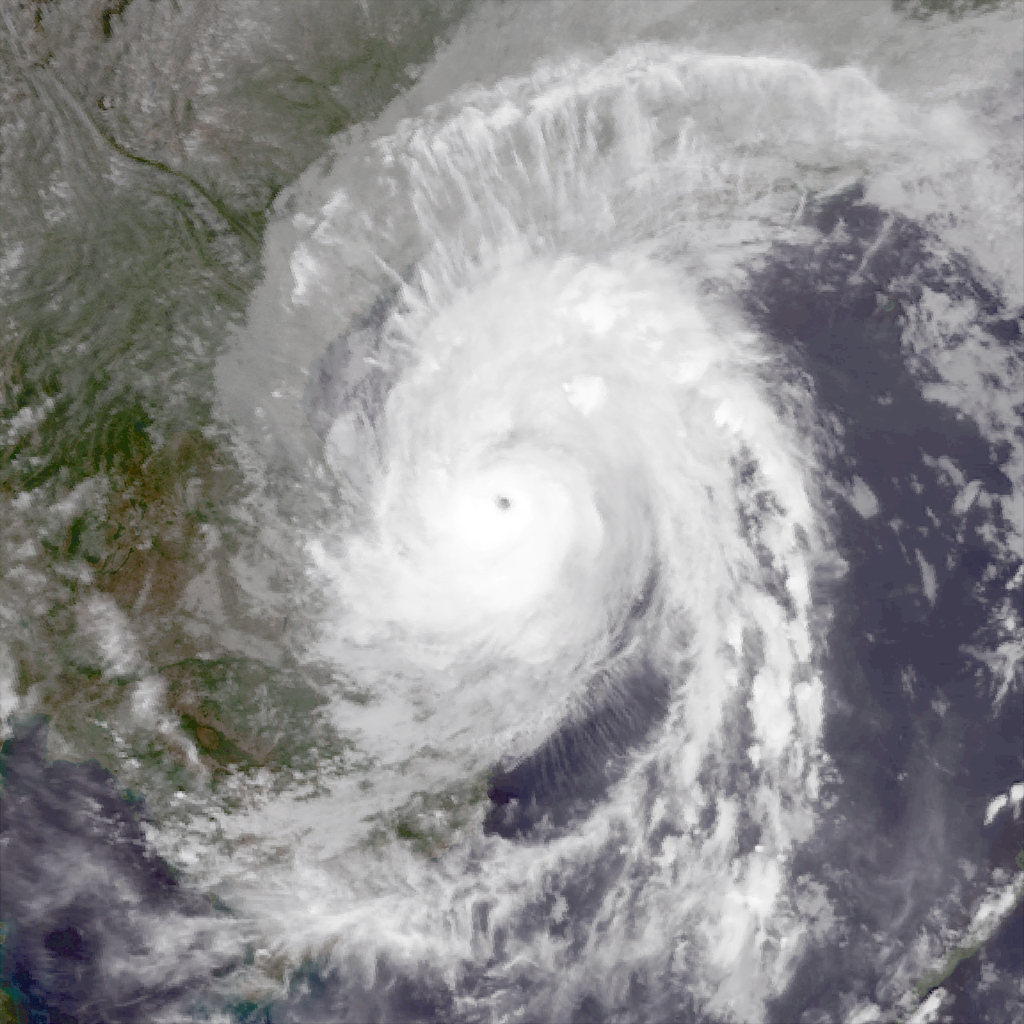
Son-Tinh just before peak intensity and landfall

October 29

- 0300 UTC - The typhoon rapidly weakens to an overland low.

=== November ===
November 12

- 0000 UTC - An area of low-pressure formed south of the South China Sea, in which vertical windshear is low to moderate.
- 0300 UTC - The JTWC classifies it as Tropical Depression 25W.
- 0900 UTC - JMA upgrades it to a weak tropical depression.

November 13

- 1800 UTC - Due to cool waters and high vertical windshear, 25W reaches its maximum intensity and very rapidly weakened, as the JTWC stops monitoring it.

November 14

- 0600 UTC - JMA makes its final warning on 25W.
- 1800 UTC - 25W rapidly dissipates over waters.

November 23

- 0600 UTC - A large area of convection occurred near but north of the equator and gradually intensified into a tropical disturbance.
- 1800 UTC - The tropical disturbance had entered in an area of low vertical windshear, favorable environments and very warm waters.

November 25

- 0900 UTC - The JMA upgraded it to a tropical depression and in the same time, JTWC dubbed it to Tropical Depression 26W.

November 27

- 0900 UTC - Both agencies upgraded it to a tropical storm, naming it Bopha.

Animated enhanced infrared satellite loop of Typhoon Bopha from peak intensity to landfall in the Philippines

November 29

- 1500 UTC - JMA upgrades Bopha to a severe tropical storm.
- 2100 UTC - JTWC upgrades Bopha to a minimal typhoon.
  - - JMA upgrades Bopha to a typhoon.

=== December ===
December 1

- 0000 UTC - Due to rapid deepening of Bopha during the very late hours of November 30, JTWC upgrades it to a category 4 typhoon.
- 0900 UTC - Due to favorable environments and very warm waters, Bopha had intensified into a super typhoon.

December 2

- 1800 UTC - PAGASA had announced that Bopha had entered their area, giving the name Pablo.

December 3

- 1800 UTC - Bopha had intensified into a category 5 super typhoon.
- 2100 UTC - Bopha made landfall over eastern Mindanao.

December 5

- 1500 UTC - Bopha, a tropical storm due to land reaction, had reached the South China.

December 7

- 0600 UTC - Bopha intensified into a category 1 to a category 4 typhoon, due to warm waters.
- 1200 UTC - JTWC downgrades Bopha to a category 3 typhoon.

December 8

- 2100 UTC - Due to vertical windshear, JMA and JTWC downgrades Bopha to a tropical storm.

December 9

- 0000 UTC - Bopha had fully dissipated, due to a developing tail-end of a cold front.

December 24

- 0300 UTC - JMA starts issuing advisories on a tropical depression, which had develop several kilometers northeast of Palau.
- 1200 UTC - PAGASA had upgraded the tropical depression, too. With that, PAGASA named the system, Quinta.
- 1500 UTC - JTWC also starts issuing advisories on Quinta, giving the designation 27W.

December 25

- 0000 UTC - JMA upgrades the system to Tropical Storm Wukong.
- 0900 UTC - JTWC and PAGASA upgrades it to a tropical storm, too, as it makes landfall over eastern Visayas.

December 27

- 0300 UTC - Wukong weakens as it enters the South China Sea and regains strength but not a tropical storm.

December 29

- 0000 UTC - JMA and JTWC stops issuing warnings on Wukong, as it rapidly dissipates due to vertical windshear.

December 31

- 2359 UTC - The 2012 Pacific typhoon season officially ends as the 2013 Pacific typhoon season officially starts.

== See also ==
- Timeline of the 2012 Pacific hurricane season
- Timeline of the 2012 Atlantic hurricane season
