= Tropical cyclones in 2012 =

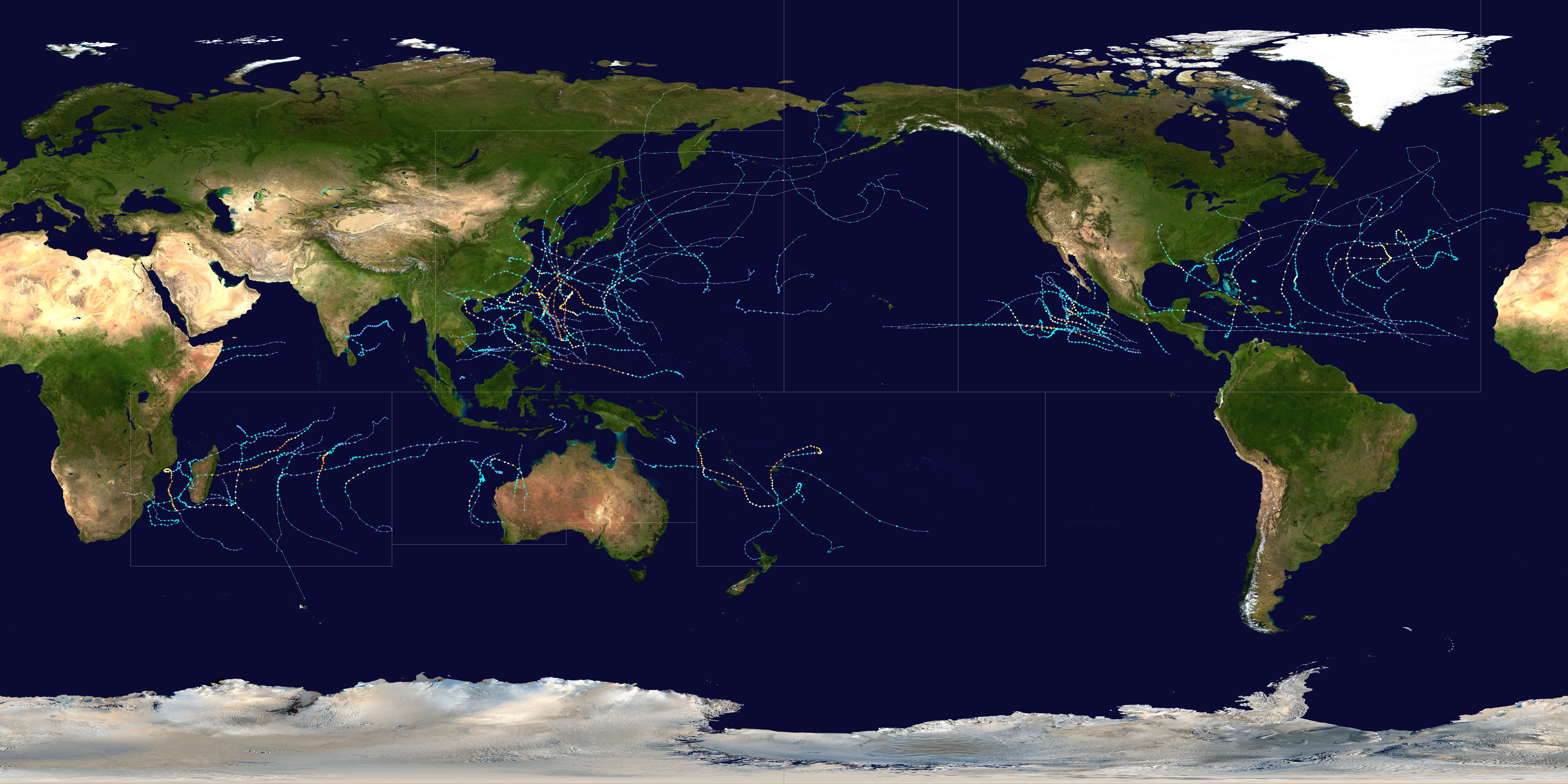
- Year summary map

Year boundaries
- First system: 06U and Chanda
- Formed: January 5, 2012
- Last system: Dumile
- Dissipated: January 5, 2013

Strongest system
- Name: Sanba
- Lowest pressure: 900 mbar (hPa); 26.58 inHg

Longest lasting system
- Name: Nadine
- Duration: 24 days

Year statistics
- Total systems: 128
- Named systems: 85
- Total fatalities: 3,231 total
- Total damage: $94.05 billion (2012 USD)
Related articles
- 2012 Atlantic hurricane season
- 2012 Pacific hurricane season
- 2012 Pacific typhoon season
- 2012 North Indian Ocean cyclone season
- 2011–12 South-West Indian Ocean cyclone season
- 2012–13 South-West Indian Ocean cyclone season
- 2011–12 Australian region cyclone season
- 2012–13 Australian region cyclone season
- 2011–12 South Pacific cyclone season
- 2012–13 South Pacific cyclone season

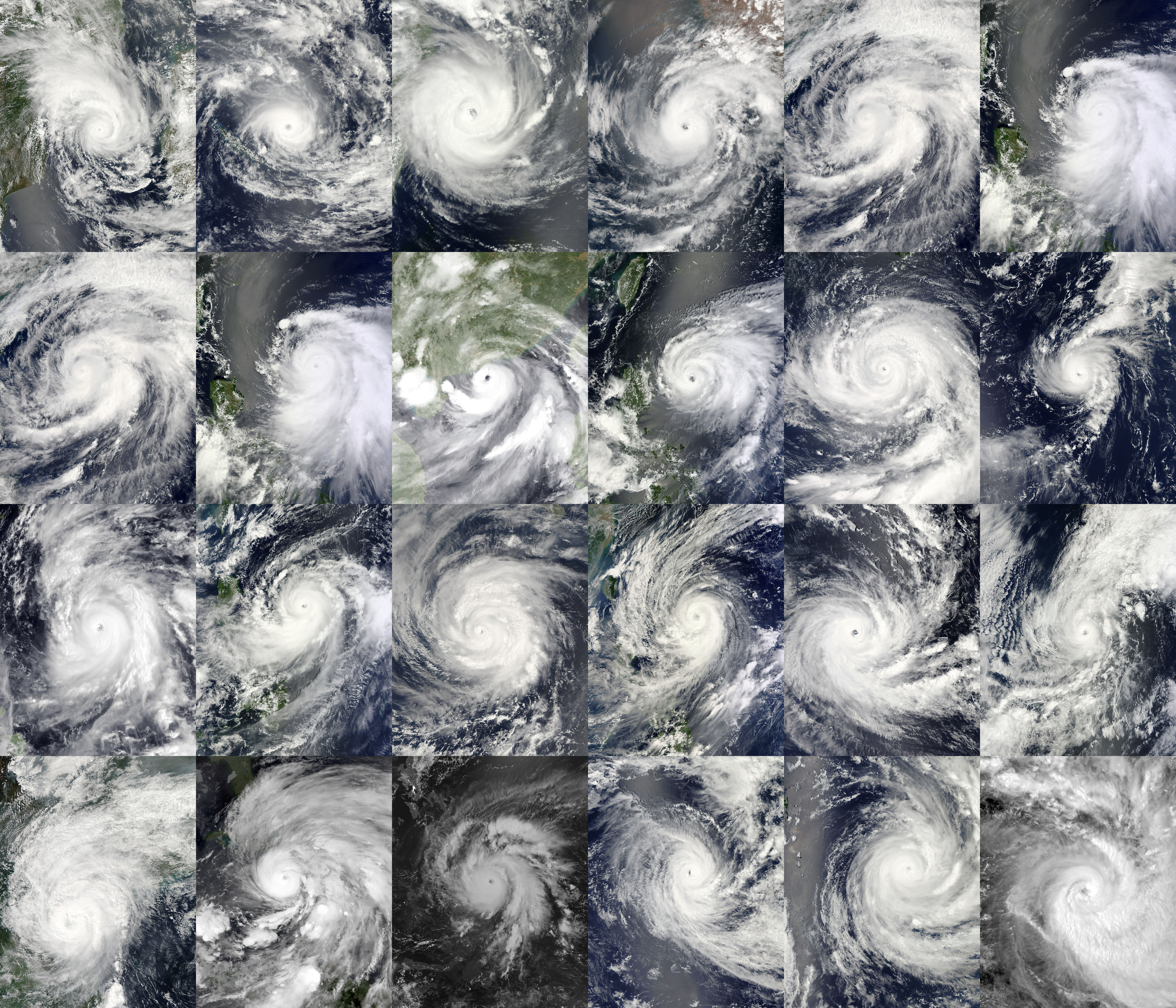
Satellite photos of the 24 tropical cyclones worldwide that reached at least Category 3 on the Saffir–Simpson scale during 2012, from Funso in January to Freda in December. Among them, Sanba (first image in the third row) was the most intense, with a minimum central pressure of 900 hPa.

During 2012, tropical cyclones formed within seven different tropical cyclone basins, located within various parts of the Atlantic, Pacific and Indian Oceans. During the year, a total of 120 tropical cyclones had formed this year to date. 86 tropical cyclones had been named by either a Regional Specialized Meteorological Center (RSMC) or a Tropical Cyclone Warning Center (TCWC).

The most active basin in the year was the Western Pacific, which documented 25 named systems, while the North Atlantic saw its fifth-most-active season on record, tied with 1887, 1995, 2010, and 2011. Conversely, the Eastern Pacific hurricane season experienced an average number of cyclones reaching tropical storm intensity, numbering 17 respectively. The least-active basin of the year was the North Indian Ocean, which had a late start with its first system forming in October. Activity across the southern hemisphere's three basins—South-West Indian, Australian, and South Pacific—was spread evenly, with each region recording seven named storms apiece. So far, twenty-four Category 3 tropical cyclones formed, including three Category 5 tropical cyclones in the year. The accumulated cyclone energy (ACE) index for the 2012 (seven basins combined), as calculated by Colorado State University was 740.5 units.

The strongest tropical cyclone was Typhoon Sanba, which strengthened to a minimum barometric pressure of 900 mbar (hPa; 26.58 inHg) before striking South Korea. The costliest tropical cyclone of the year was Hurricane Sandy, which caused $68.7 billion (2012 USD) in damages after striking the Caribbean and United States. The deadliest tropical cyclone of the year was Typhoon Bopha which caused widespread destruction on Mindanao, leaving thousands of people homeless and killing 1,901 people.

== Global atmospheric and hydrological conditions ==
The Atlantic Ocean began an organization favorable to the sea surface temperatures, while the Eastern and Central Pacific Ocean began on unfavorable conditions due to dissipation of the 2010–12 La Niña event in April 2012. During the month of May to November along the Pacific hurricane season a favorable organization began due to the sea surface temperatures and the formation of El Niño–Southern Oscillation.

== Summary ==
Nineteen tropical cyclones formed in the Atlantic hurricane season, the third-most active in history with previous 1887, 1995, 2010 and 2011 seasons. On East Pacific and Central Pacific, a total of 17 named storms formed during the season.

== Systems ==
A total of 132 systems formed globally in the year with 52 of them causing significant damage, deaths, and/or setting records for their basin.

=== January ===
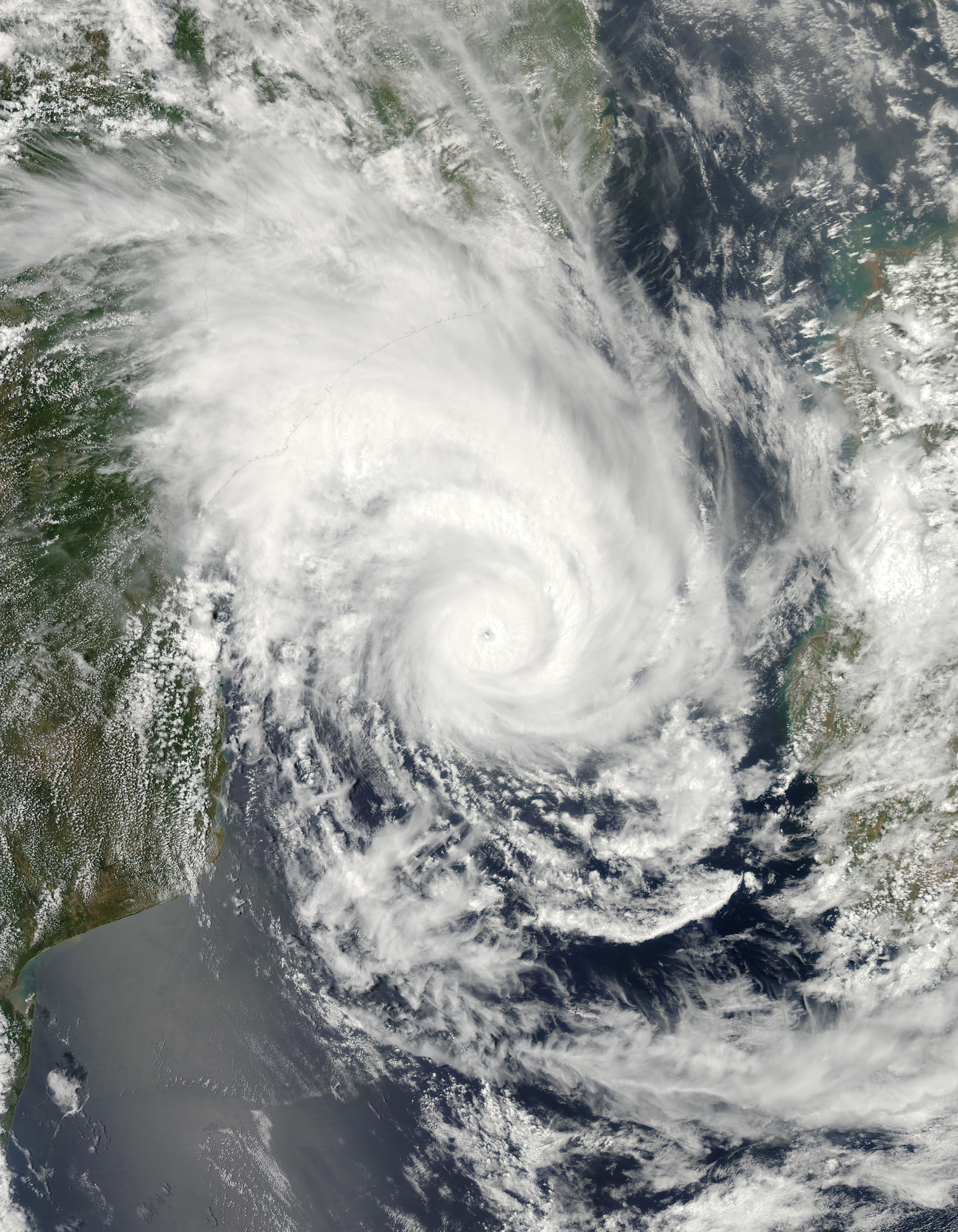
Cyclone Funso

January was the most active month of the year with 21 tropical cyclones forming, However, only six were named by specific tropical cyclone naming agencies. Intense Tropical Cyclone Funso produced flooding rains as it looped in the Mozambique Channel, killing at least 21 people, soon after Subtropical Depression Dando killed 10 people across southern Africa.

Tropical cyclones formed in January 2012
| Storm name | Dates active | Max wind km/h (mph) | Pressure (hPa) | Areas affected | Damage (USD) | Deaths | Refs |
|---|---|---|---|---|---|---|---|
| 06U | January 5 | Unspecified | Unspecified | Timor | None | None | |
| Chanda | January 5–10 | 75 (45) | 992 | Madagascar | None | 1 | |
| 03F | January 7–8 | Unspecified | 1001 | Tonga | None | None | |
| 04F | January 8–9 | Unspecified | 1000 | French Polynesia | None | None | |
| 06F | January 8–10 | Unspecified | 1000 | Niue | None | None | |
| Heidi | January 9–13 | 150 (90) | 960 | Western Australia | None | None | |
| Dando | January 10–18 | 85 (50) | 992 | Madagascar, Mozambique, South Africa, Zimbabwe, Swaziland | None | 10 | |
| 08U | January 13 | Unspecified | Unspecified | None | None | None | |
| TD | January 13–14 | Unspecified | 1006 | Malaysia | None | None | |
| Ethel | January 17–22 | 100 (65) | 972 | Rodrigues | None | 1 | |
| Funso | January 17–28 | 205 (125) | 925 | Mozambique, Malawi | None | 36 | |
| 06F | January 20–24 | Unspecified | 1001 | Fiji | $17.2 million | 8 | |
| 09U | January 21 | Unspecified | Unspecified | None | None | None | |
| 10U | January 22–29 | 55 (35) | 993 | Northern Territory, Queensland | None | None | |
| Iggy | January 22–February 3 | 110 (70) | 970 | Indonesia, Western Australia | None | 16 | |
| 07F | January 25–February 2 | 55 (35) | 994 | Vanuatu, Fiji, New Caledonia | None | None | |
| 08F | January 26–28 | Unspecified | 1001 | Fiji | None | None | |
| 09F | January 30–31 | 55 (35) | 998 | Vanuatu, Fiji | None | None | |

=== February ===
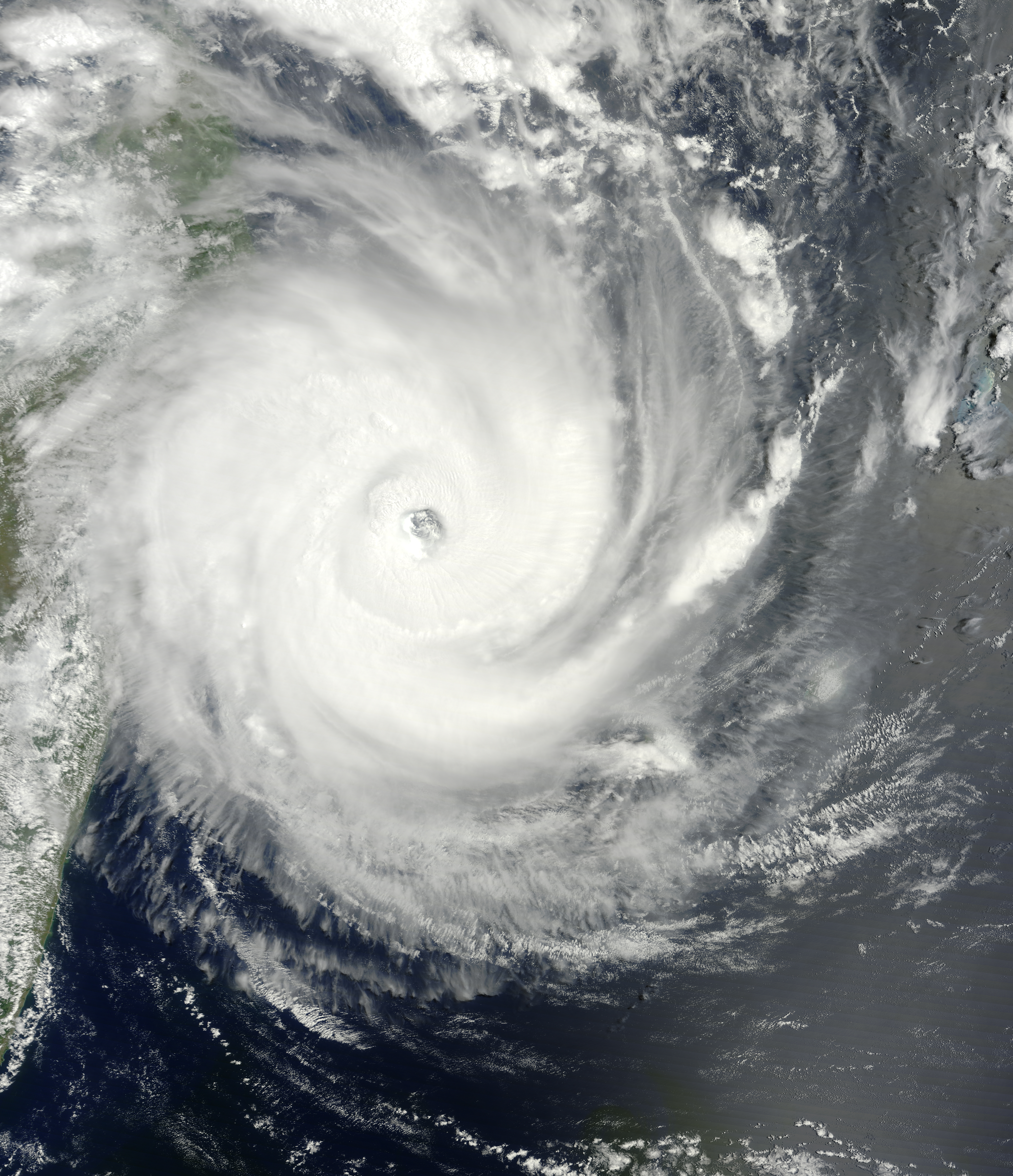
Cyclone Giovanna

A total of nine tropical systems of all intensities were monitored during February 2012, of which five developed further and were named by the various warning centres. Intense Tropical Cyclone Giovanna was a powerful tropical cyclone that affected Madagascar. Giovanna is still blamed for 33 deaths along the Madagascar coast, and it is the first intense tropical cyclone to impact Madagascar, since Cyclone Bingiza in February 2011.

Tropical cyclones formed in February 2012
| Storm name | Dates active | Max wind km/h (mph) | Pressure (hPa) | Areas affected | Damage (USD) | Deaths | Refs |
|---|---|---|---|---|---|---|---|
| Jasmine | February 1–19 | 195 (120) | 937 | Northern Territory, Queensland, Solomon Islands, Vanuatu, New Caledonia, Tonga | None | None | |
| 10F | February 2–6 | 35 (25) | 991 | Vanuatu, New Caledonia, Fiji, Tonga | None | None | |
| Cyril | February 5–8 | 95 (60) | 985 | Fiji, Tonga | None | None | |
| Hilwa | February 5–22 | 75 (45) | 993 | Christmas Island, Cocos Islands, Rodriges | None | None | |
| Giovanna | February 7–22 | 195 (125) | 935 | Mauritius, Réunion, Madagascar | None | 35 | |
| 10F | February 13–17 | Unspecified | 1005 | New Caledonia, Vanuatu | None | None | |
| 01W | February 17–21 | 55 (35) | 1004 | Philippines | None | None | |
| Irina | February 25–March 12 | 95 (60) | 978 | Madagascar, Mozambique, Swaziland, South Africa | None | 77 | |
| 12 | February 29–March 3 | 55 (35) | 996 | None | None | None | |

=== March ===
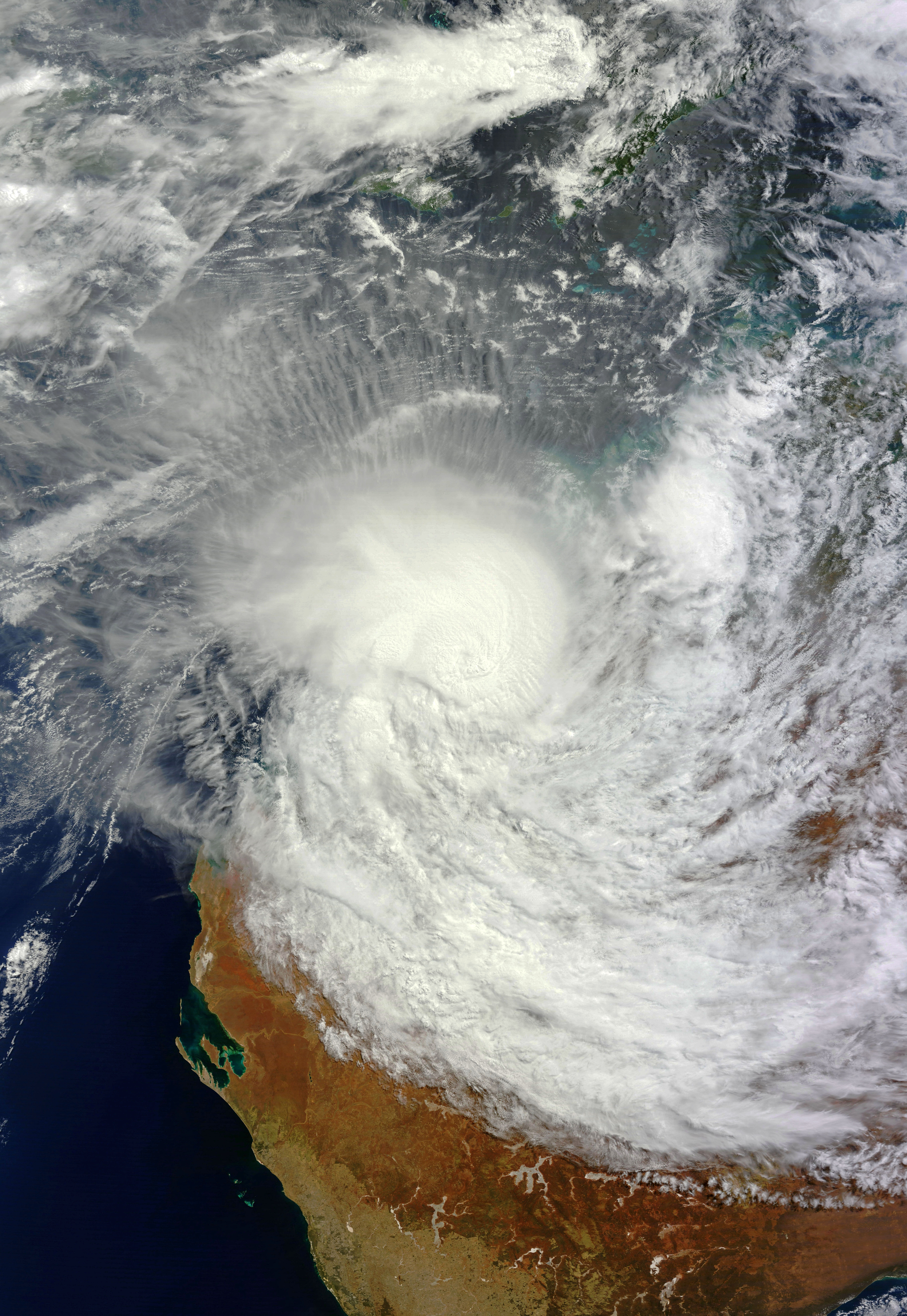
Cyclone Lua

A total of twelve tropical systems of all intensities were monitored during March 2012, of which four developed further and were named by the various warning centres. Cyclone Lua affected a sparsely populated region of Western Australia.

Tropical cyclones formed in March 2012
| Storm name | Dates active | Max wind km/h (mph) | Pressure (hPa) | Areas affected | Damage (USD) | Deaths | Refs |
|---|---|---|---|---|---|---|---|
| 14U | March 3–7 | Unspecified | 1000 | Western Australia | None | None | |
| Koji-Joni | March 5–11 | 95 (60) | 978 | None | None | None | |
| Lua | March 9–18 | 155 (100) | 935 | Western Australia | $230 million | None | |
| 17U | March 12–22 | 55 (35) | 993 | Western Australia, Northern Territory, Queensland | None | None | |
| 14F | March 16–18 | Unspecified | 1005 | New Zealand | None | 5 | |
| 15F | March 19–20 | Unspecified | 1004 | New Caledonia | None | None | |
| 16F | March 22–27 | Unspecified | 1003 | Wallis and Futuna, Fiji | None | None | |
| TD | March 24 | Unspecified | 1008 | Philippines | None | None | |
| 17F | March 25–28 | Unspecified | 1000 | Fiji | None | None | |
| Pakhar | March 26–April 2 | 95 (60) | 1000 | Philippines, Vietnam, Cambodia, Thailand | $48.1 million | 9 | |
| Daphne | March 29–April 3 | 100 (65) | 985 | Vanuatu, Fiji | None | 5 | |
| 18F | March 30–31 | Unspecified | 1004 | Vanuatu | None | None | |

=== April ===
A total of 4 tropical cyclones formed during this month, making this month the least active of 2012. None of these tropical cyclones were tropical storm strength or higher. Although Tropical Storm Daphne persisted into April, it was counted for the month of March, as that was the month it had formed in.

Tropical cyclones formed in April 2012
| Storm name | Dates active | Max wind km/h (mph) | Pressure (hPa) | Areas affected | Damage (USD) | Deaths | Refs |
|---|---|---|---|---|---|---|---|
| TD | April 8–11 | 55 (35) | 1000 | None | None | None | |
| 20F | April 9–11 | Unspecified | 1009 | New Caledonia | None | None | |
| 19U | April 16–25 | Unspecified | 1005 | Papua New Guinea, Northern Territory, Queensland, Indonesia, East Timor | None | None | |
| TD | April 28–30 | Unspecified | 1008 | Palau, Philippines | None | None | |

=== May ===
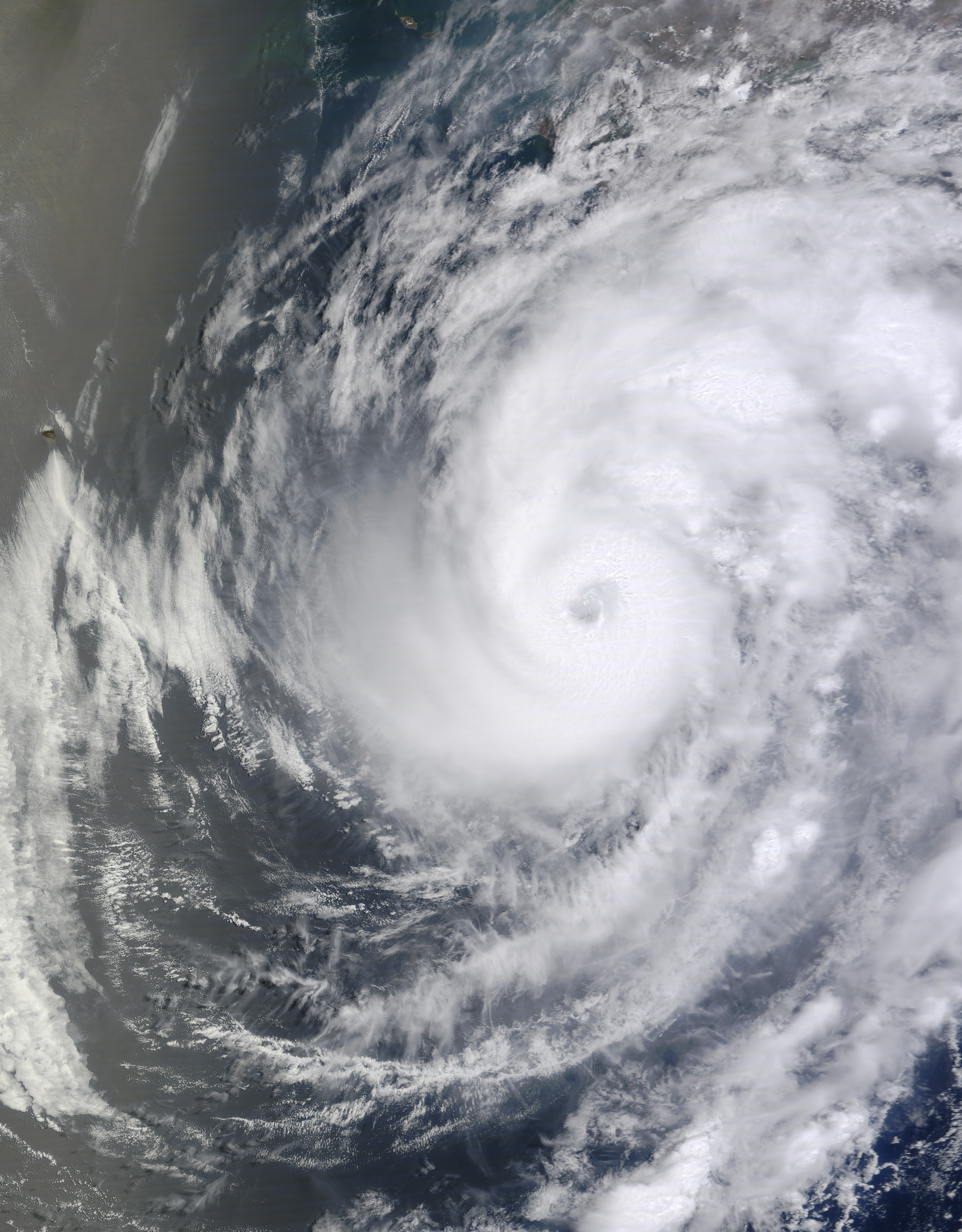
Hurricane Bud

Tropical cyclones formed in May 2012
| Storm name | Dates active | Max wind km/h (mph) | Pressure (hPa) | Areas affected | Damage (USD) | Deaths | Refs |
|---|---|---|---|---|---|---|---|
| 19S | May 7–14 | 55 (35) | 996 | Indonesia, East Timor | None | None | |
| Aletta | May 14–19 | 85 (50) | 1000 | None | None | None | |
| Alberto | May 19–22 | 95 (60) | 995 | Southeastern United States | None | None | |
| Sanvu | May 20–27 | 110 (70) | 975 | Guam, Marina Islands | $20 thousand | None | |
| Bud | May 20–26 | 185 (115) | 961 | Western Mexico | Minimal | None | |
| Beryl | May 26–30 | 110 (70) | 992 | Cuba, The Bahamas, Southeastern United States, Florida | Minimal | None | |
| Mawar (Ambo) | May 31–June 6 | 140 (85) | 960 | Philippines, Japan | None | 3 | |

=== June ===
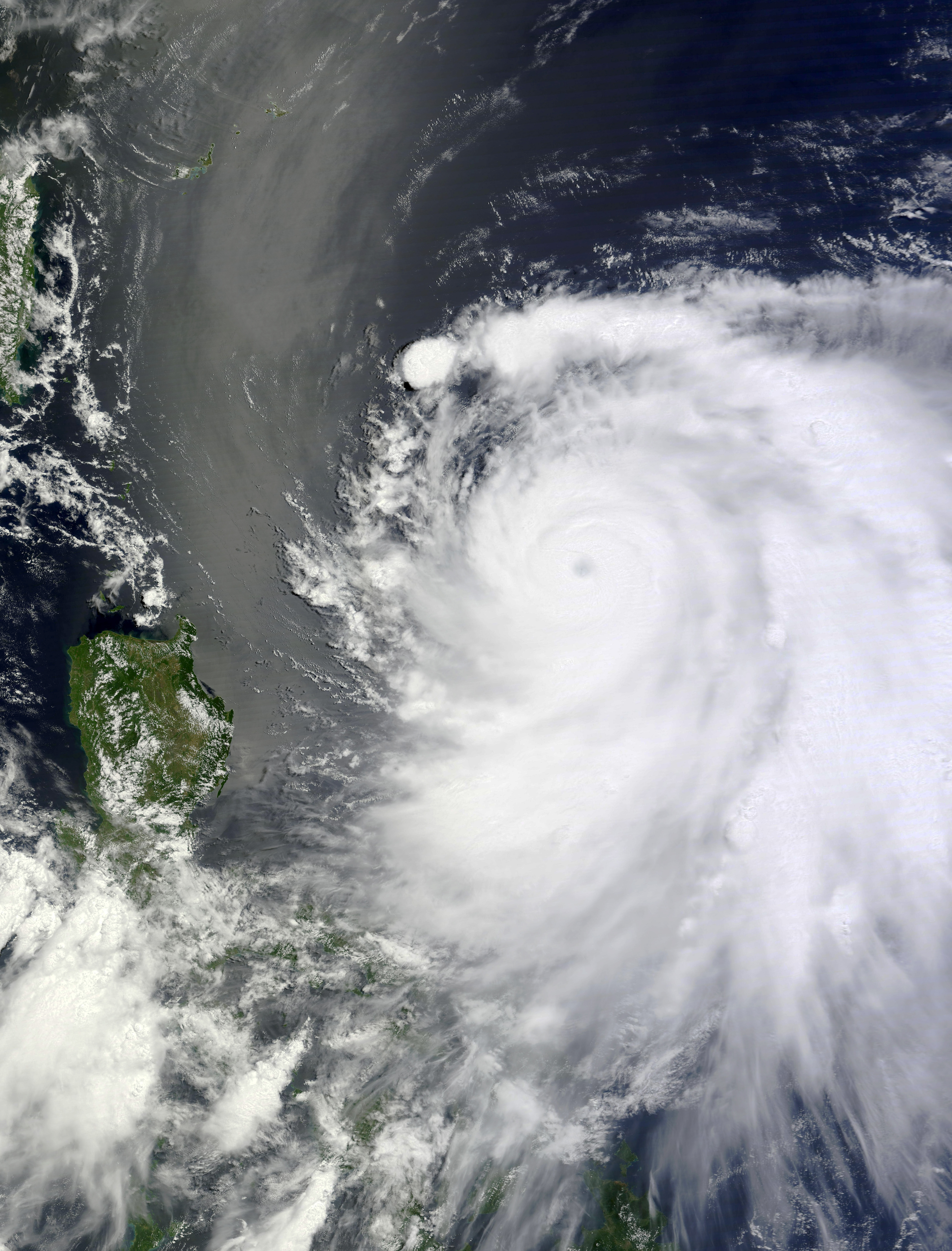
Typhoon Guchol

Tropical cyclones formed in June 2012
| Storm name | Dates active | Max wind km/h (mph) | Pressure (hPa) | Areas affected | Damage (USD) | Deaths | Refs |
|---|---|---|---|---|---|---|---|
| Kuena | June 3–8 | 85 (50) | 994 | None | None | None | |
| Guchol (Butchoy) | June 10–20 | 185 (115) | 930 | Caroline Islands, Philippines, Japan | $100 million | 3 | |
| Carlotta | June 14–16 | 175 (110) | 973 | Southwestern Mexico | $12.4 million | 7 | |
| Talim (Carina) | June 16–21 | 95 (60) | 985 | China, Taiwan | $356 million | 1 | |
| Chris | June 18–22 | 140 (85) | 974 | Bermuda, Atlantic Canada | None | None | |
| Debby | June 23–27 | 110 (70) | 990 | Cuba, Central America, Southeastern United States (Florida), Bermuda | ≥ $250 million | 7 (3) | |
| Doksuri (Dindo) | June 25–30 | 75 (45) | 992 | Philippines, Taiwan, China | $418 thousand | None | |
| 20U | June 29–July 1 | 45 (30) | 993 | Papua New Guinea | None | None | |

=== July ===
Typhoon Vicente

July was slightly active with only seven tropical cyclones being named, with all of them being named.

Tropical cyclones formed in July 2012
| Storm name | Dates active | Max wind km/h (mph) | Pressure (hPa) | Areas affected | Damage (USD) | Deaths | Refs |
|---|---|---|---|---|---|---|---|
| Daniel | July 4–12 | 185 (115) | 961 | None | None | None | |
| Emilia | July 7–15 | 220 (140) | 945 | None | None | None | |
| Fabio | July 12–18 | 175 (110) | 966 | Baja California Peninsula, California, Western United States | None | None | |
| Khanun (Enteng) | July 14–19 | 95 (60) | 985 | Japan, Korea | $11.4 million | 89 | |
| Vicente (Ferdie) | July 18–25 | 150 (90) | 950 | Philippines, China, Vietnam, Laos, Burma | $324 million | 32 | |
| Saola (Gener) | July 26–August 4 | 130 (80) | 960 | Philippines, Taiwan, Japan, China | $2.95 billion | 86 | |
| Damrey | July 27–August 4 | 130 (80) | 965 | Japan, China, South Korea | $4.37 billion | 48 | |

=== August ===
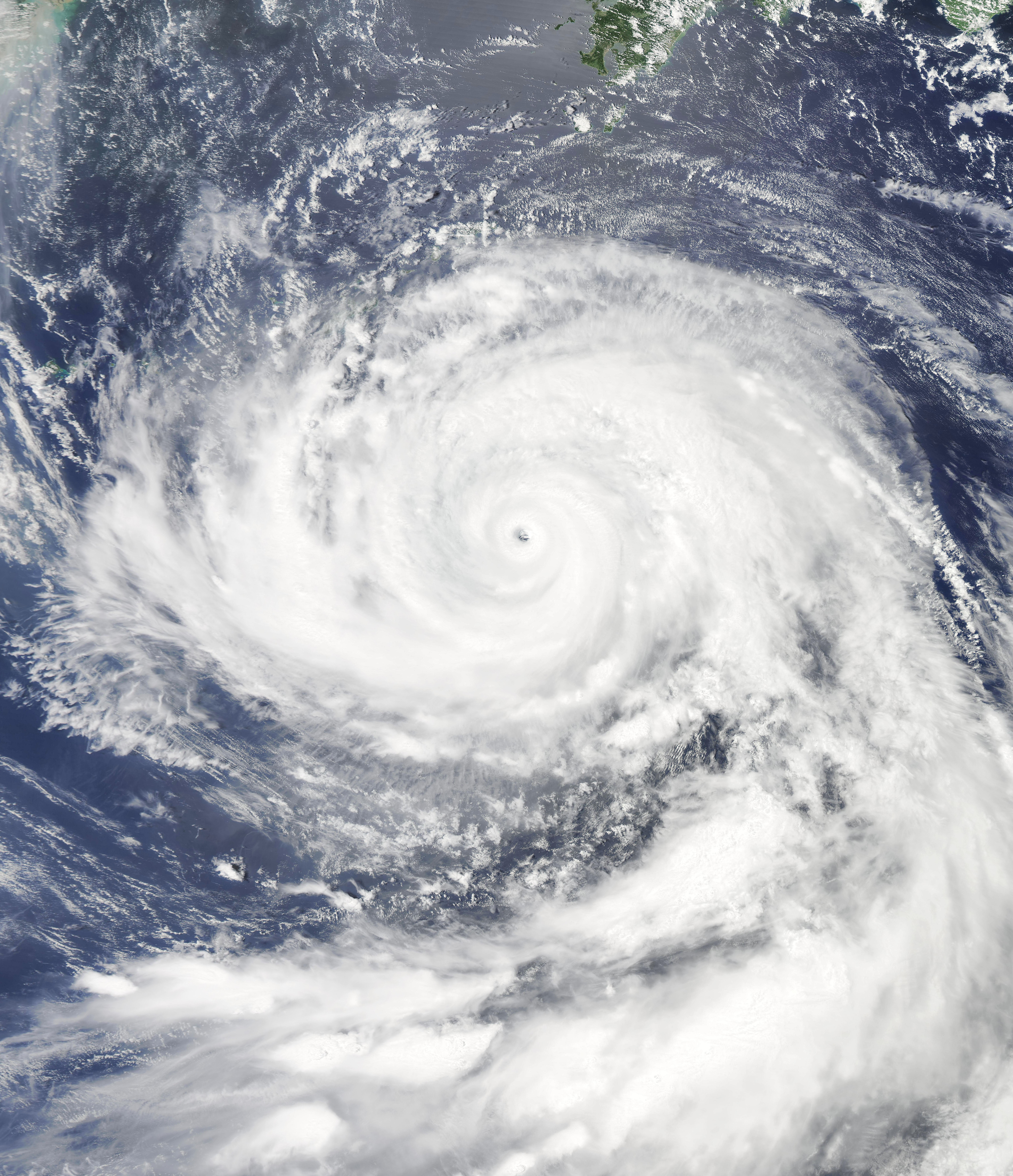
Typhoon Bolaven

Tropical cyclones formed in August 2012
| Storm name | Dates active | Max wind km/h (mph) | Pressure (hPa) | Areas affected | Damage (USD) | Deaths | Refs |
|---|---|---|---|---|---|---|---|
| Haikui | August 1–11 | 120 (75) | 965 | Japan, Philippines, China | $5.92 billion | 115 | |
| Ernesto | August 1–10 | 155 (100) | 973 | Windward Islands, Jamaica, Central America, Yucatán Peninsula, Veracruz | $252.2 million | 7 (5) | |
| Florence | August 3–6 | 95 (60) | 1002 | Cape Verde | None | None | |
| Kirogi | August 3–10 | 95 (60) | 990 | Japan | None | None | |
| Gilma | August 7–11 | 130 (80) | 984 | None | None | None | |
| TD | August 9–11 | Unspecified | 1008 | None | None | None | |
| Helene | August 9–18 | 75 (45) | 1004 | Windward Islands, Trinidad and Tobago, Central America, Mexico (Tamaulipas) | > $17 million | 2 | |
| Hector | August 11–16 | 85 (50) | 995 | Western Mexico, Baja California Peninsula | None | None | |
| Kai-tak (Helen) | August 12–18 | 120 (75) | 970 | Philippines, China, Vietnam, Laos | $765 million | 38 | |
| Gordon | August 15–20 | 175 (110) | 965 | Azores | None | None | |
| Tembin (Igme) | August 17–30 | 150 (90) | 950 | Philippines, Taiwan, China, Japan, South Korea | $8.25 million | 10 | |
| Bolaven (Julian) | August 19–29 | 185 (115) | 910 | Ryukyu Islands, Kyushu Northeastern China, South Korea, North Korea, Russian Far East | $3.59 billion | 96 | |
| Isaac | August 21–September 1 | 130 (80) | 965 | Leeward Islands, Puerto Rico, Hispaniola, Cuba, The Bahamas, Southeastern United States (Florida, Louisiana, Arkansas, Mississippi, and Alabama), Midwestern United States (Missouri, Illinois, and Indiana), Kentucky | $3.11 billion | 34 (7) | |
| Joyce | August 22–24 | 65 (40) | 1006 | None | None | None | |
| TD | August 23–24 | Unspecified | 1006 | Japan | None | None | |
| Ileana | August 27–September 2 | 140 (85) | 978 | None | None | None | |
| Kirk | August 28–September 2 | 165 (105) | 970 | None | None | None | |
| Leslie | August 30–September 11 | 130 (80) | 968 | Leeward Islands, Bermuda, Atlantic Canada | $10.1 million | None | |

=== September ===
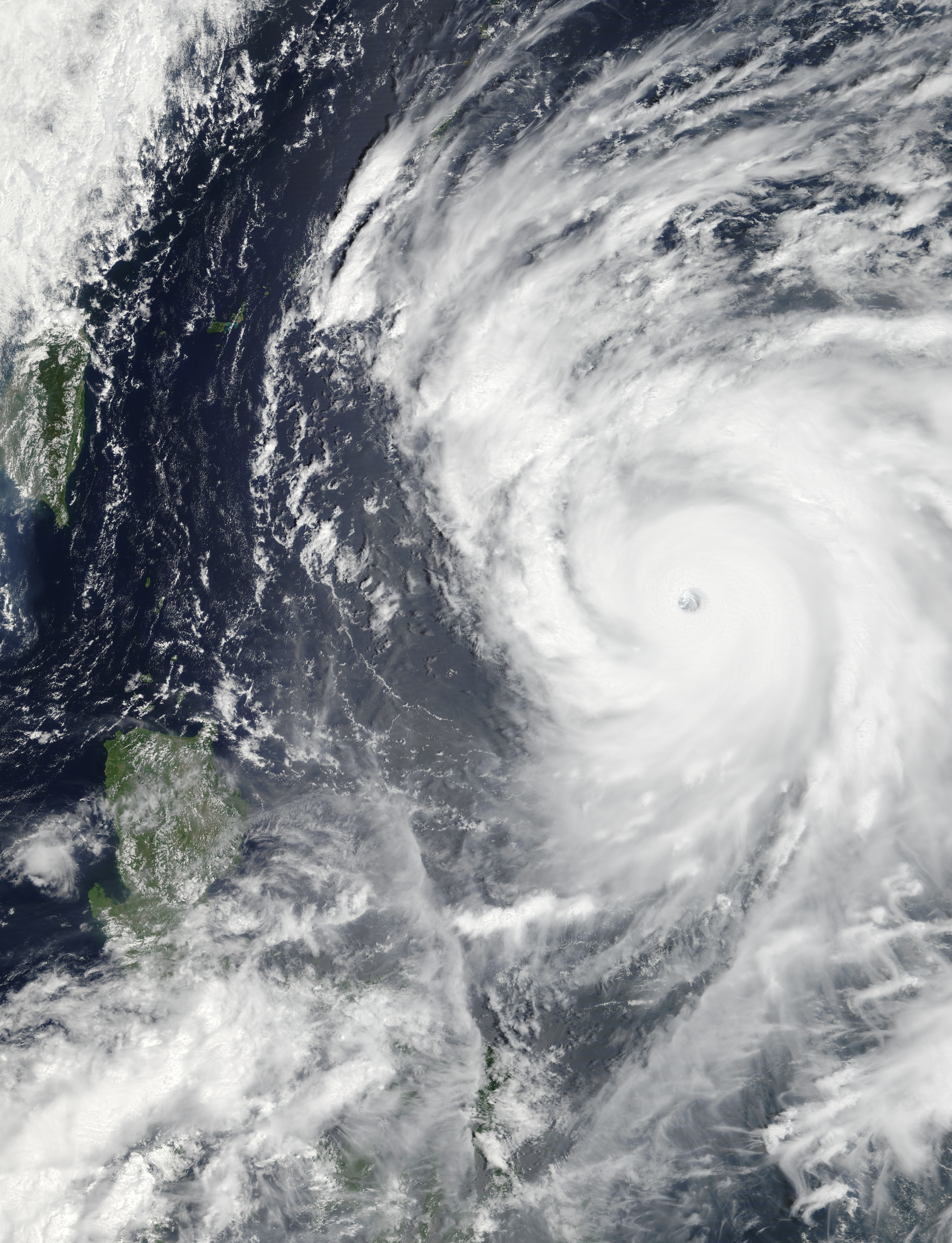
Typhoon Sanba

Tropical cyclones formed in September 2012
| Storm name | Dates active | Max wind km/h (mph) | Pressure (hPa) | Areas affected | Damage (USD) | Deaths | Refs |
|---|---|---|---|---|---|---|---|
| John | September 2–4 | 75 (45) | 1000 | Baja California Peninsula | None | None | |
| Michael | September 3–11 | 185 (115) | 964 | None | None | None | |
| Nadine | September 10–October 4 | 150 (90) | 978 | Azores, United Kingdom | None | None | |
| Sanba (Karen) | September 10–18 | 205 (125) | 900 | Palau, Japan, South Korea, North Korea, China, Russia | $378.8 million | 6 | |
| TD | September 10–13 | 55 (35) | 1006 | Japan | None | None | |
| Kristy | September 12–17 | 95 (60) | 998 | Baja California Peninsula | None | None | |
| Lane | September 15–19 | 140 (85) | 985 | None | None | None | |
| Jelawat (Lawin) | September 20–October 1 | 205 (125) | 905 | Japan, Philippines, Taiwan | $27.4 million | 3 | |
| Miriam | September 22–27 | 195 (120) | 959 | Baja California Peninsula, Texas | None | None | |
| Ewiniar | September 23–30 | 95 (60) | 985 | Mariana Islands, Japan | None | None | |
| Norman | September 28–29 | 85 (50) | 997 | Western Mexico, Baja California Peninsula, Northwestern Mexico, Texas | Minimal | 1 | |
| Maliksi | September 29–October 4 | 95 (60) | 985 | Guam, Marina Islands, Japan | None | None | |
| Gaemi (Garce) | September 29–October 7 | 95 (60) | 990 | Philippines, Vietnam, Cambodia, Thailand | $4.1 million | 5 | |

=== October ===
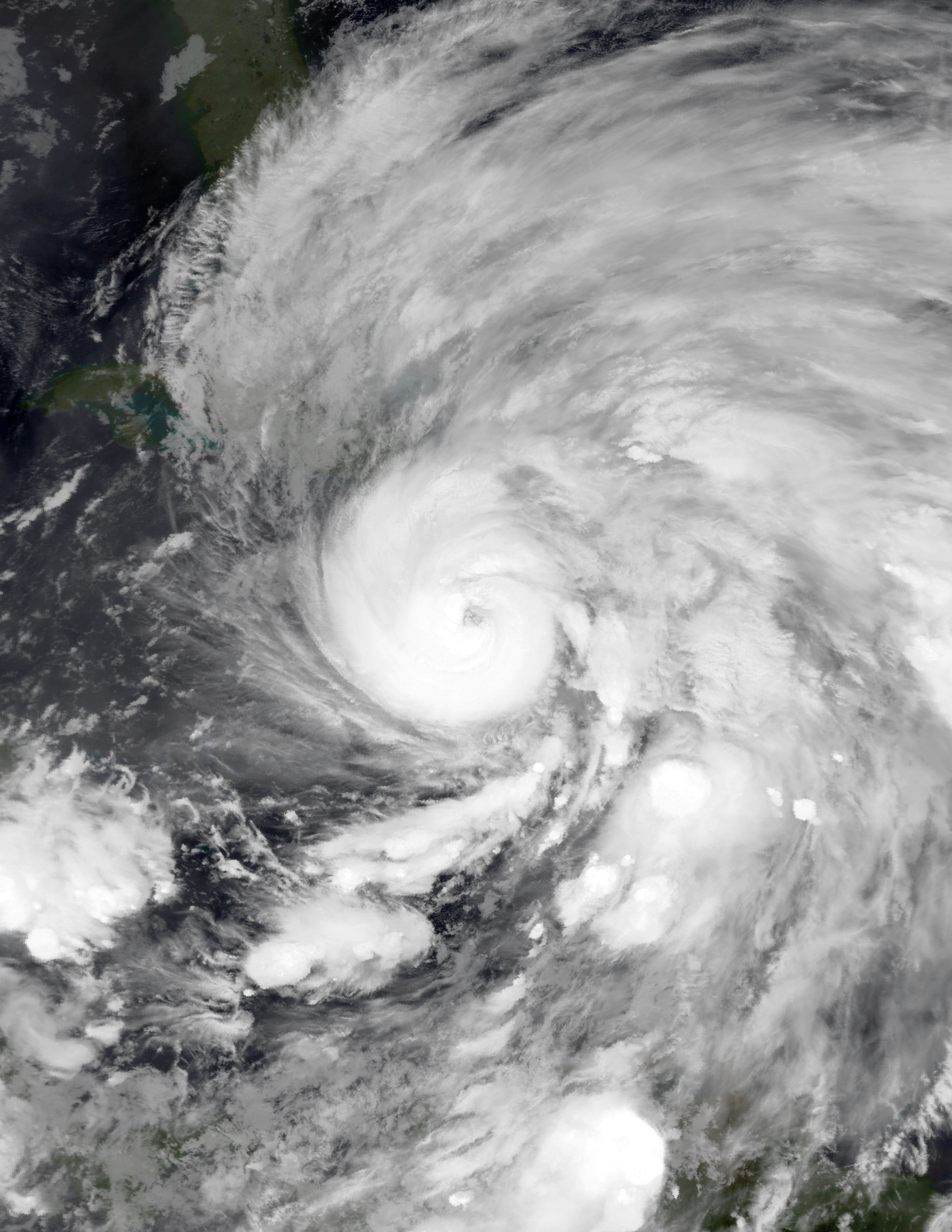
Hurricane Sandy

Tropical cyclones formed in October 2012
| Storm name | Dates active | Max wind km/h (mph) | Pressure (hPa) | Areas affected | Damage (USD) | Deaths | Refs |
|---|---|---|---|---|---|---|---|
| Oscar | October 3–5 | 85 (50) | 994 | None | None | None | |
| Prapiroon (Nina) | October 5–19 | 165 (105) | 940 | Japan | None | 1 | |
| Olivia | October 6–8 | 95 (60) | 997 | None | None | None | |
| BOB 01 | October 10–11 | 55 (35) | 1002 | Bangladesh | Minimal | 43 | |
| Patty | October 11–13 | 75 (45) | 1005 | Bahamas | None | None | |
| Rafael | October 12–17 | 150 (90) | 969 | Lesser Antilles, Bermuda, Atlantic Canada, United States East Coast, Azores, Western Europe | ≤ $2 million | 1 | |
| Anais | October 12–19 | 185 (115) | 945 | Diego Garcia, Madagascar | None | None | |
| Paul | October 13–17 | 195 (120) | 959 | Baja California Peninsula, Northwestern Mexico | $15.5 million | None | |
| Maria | October 13–20 | 95 (60) | 990 | Mariana Islands, Japan | None | None | |
| Son-Tinh (Ofel) | October 21–30 | 155 (100) | 945 | Palau, Philippines, China, Vietnam | $776 million | 42 | |
| Tony | October 22–25 | 85 (50) | 1000 | None | None | None | |
| Murjan | October 22–26 | 75 (45) | 998 | Yemen, Somalia | Minimal | None | |
| Sandy | October 22–29 | 185 (115) | 940 | Greater Antilles (Jamaica, Cuba), The Bahamas, East Coast of the United States (New Jersey), Bermuda, Atlantic Canada | $68.7 billion | 233 | |
| Nilam | October 28–November 1 | 85 (50) | 987 | Sri Lanka, South India | $56.7 million | 75 | |
| Rosa | October 30–November 3 | 85 (50) | 1001 | None | None | None | |

=== November ===
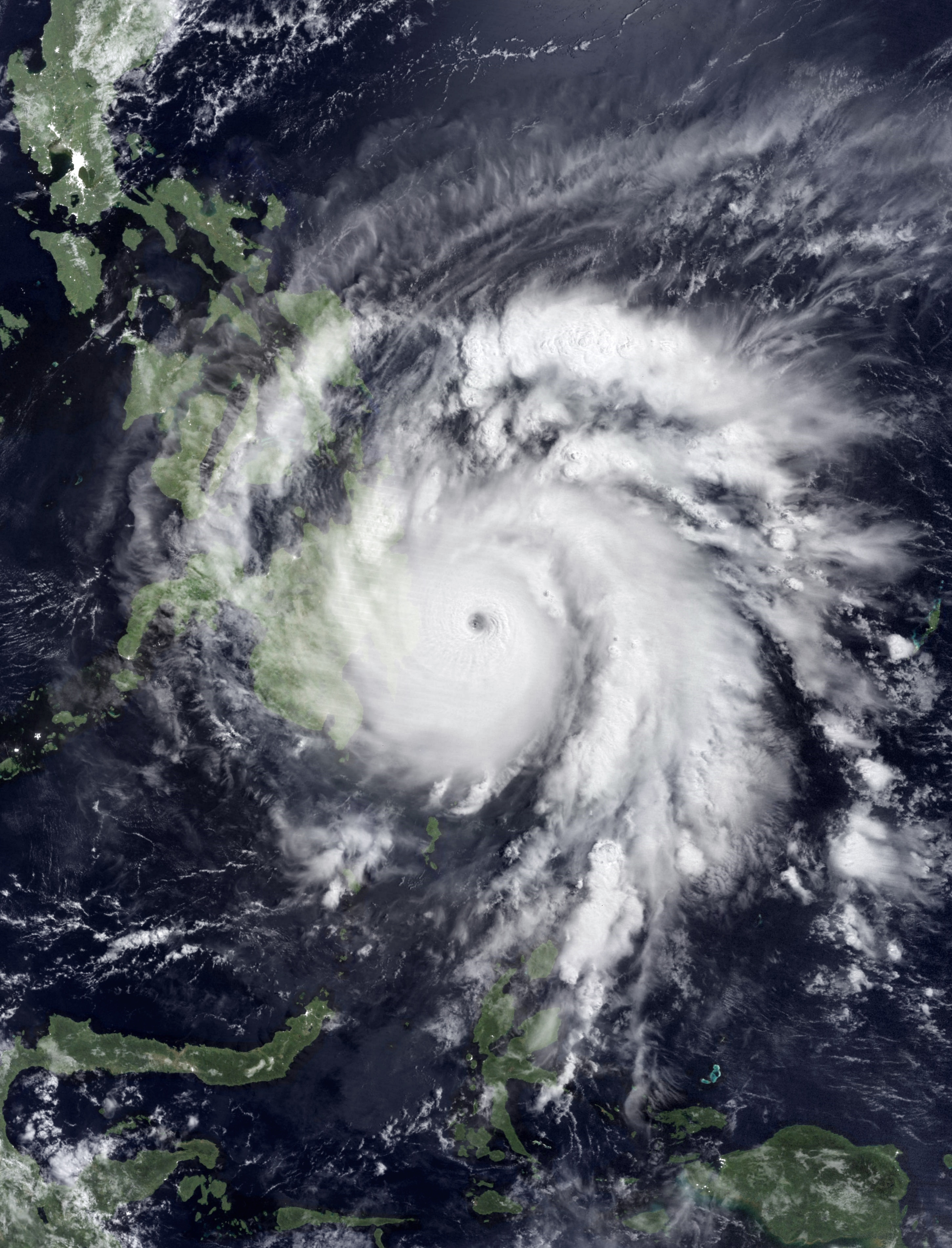
Typhoon Bopha

Tropical cyclones formed in November 2012
| Storm name | Dates active | Max wind km/h (mph) | Pressure (hPa) | Areas affected | Damage (USD) | Deaths | Refs |
|---|---|---|---|---|---|---|---|
| 01F | November 6–7 | Unspecified | 991 | Fiji | None | None | |
| 25W | November 12–15 | 55 (35) | 1004 | Malaysia, Vietnam | None | None | |
| 02 | November 15–16 | 45 (30) | 1004 | None | None | None | |
| BOB 03 | November 17–19 | 55 (35) | 1002 | India | None | None | |
| Boldwin | November 23–26 | 100 (65) | 985 | None | None | None | |
| Bopha (Pablo) | November 25–December 9 | 185 (115) | 930 | Caroline Islands, Palau, Philippines | $1.04 billion | 1,901 | |

=== December ===
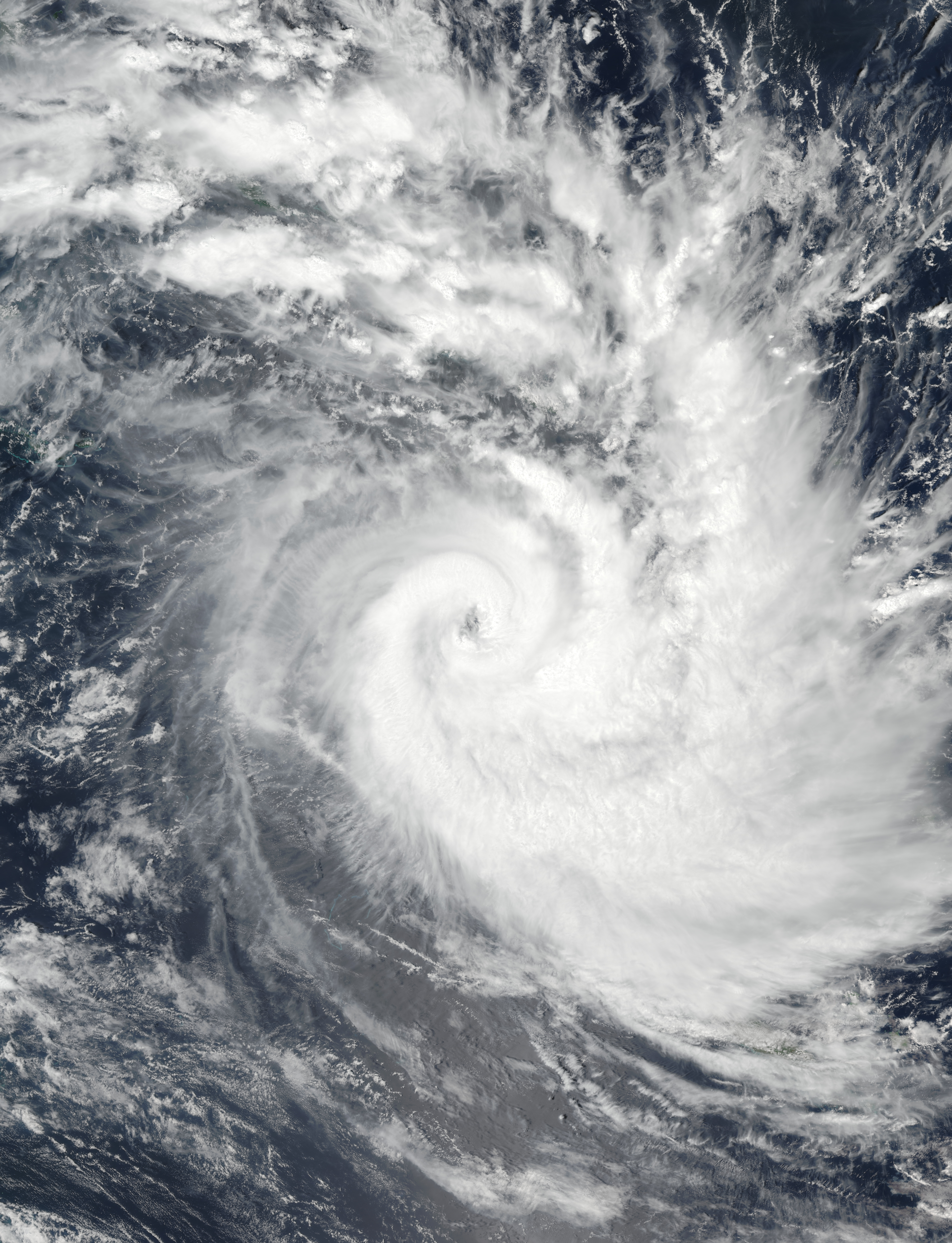
Cyclone Freda

Tropical cyclones formed in December 2012
| Storm name | Dates active | Max wind km/h (mph) | Pressure (hPa) | Areas affected | Damage (USD) | Deaths | Refs |
|---|---|---|---|---|---|---|---|
| Claudia | December 6–13 | 175 (110) | 940 | None | None | None | |
| 03F | December 9–17 | Unspecified | 997 | Cook Islands | None | None | |
| Evan | December 9–19 | 185 (115) | 943 | Samoan Islands, Wallis and Futuna, Fiji, Tonga, New Zealand | $316 million | 14 | |
| 02U | December 18–21 | Unspecified | Unspecified | None | None | None | |
| ARB 02 | December 22–24 | 55 (35) | 1002 | Somalia | None | None | |
| Wukong (Quinta) | December 24–29 | 75 (45) | 998 | Philippines, Vietnam | $5.48 million | 20 | |
| Freda | December 26, 2012 – January 4, 2013 | 185 (115) | 940 | Solomon Islands, New Caledonia | None | 2 | |
| Mitchell | December 27, 2012 – January 1, 2013 | 85 (50) | 998 | Western Australia | None | None | |
| Dumile | December 29, 2012 – January 5, 2013 | 130 (80) | 970 | Mauritius, Réunion Island | $46 million | 2 | |
| 06F | December 30–31 | Unspecified | 1005 | None | None | None | |

There are a total of seven tropical cyclone basins that tropical cyclones typically form in this table, data from all these basins are added.

| Season name | | Areas affected | Systems formed | Named storms | Hurricane-force tropical cyclones | Damage (2012 USD) | Deaths | Ref. |
|---|---|---|---|---|---|---|---|---|
| North Atlantic Ocean (Note: The wind speeds for this tropical cyclone/basin are based on the Saffir Simpson Scale which uses 1-minute sustained winds.) | | Yucatán Peninsula, Greater Antilles, East Coast of the United States, Atlantic Canada, Lesser Antilles, Lucayan Archipelago, Iceland, West Europe, Hispaniola, West Africa, Cape Verde, Azores | 19 | 19 | 10 | $72.32 billion | 200 (155) | |
| Eastern and Central Pacific Ocean | | Southwestern Mexico, Western Mexico, Baja California Peninsula, Southwestern United States | 17 | 17 | 10 | $28 million | 8 | |
| Western Pacific Ocean (Note: Only systems that formed either before or on December 31, 2012 are counted in the seasonal totals.) | | Mariana Islands, Philippines, Japan, Micronesia, China, Vietnam, Laos, Thailand, Korea, Taiwan, Caroline Islands, Palau, Malaysia | 34 | 25 | 15 | $21.03 billion | 2,523 | |
| North Indian Ocean (Note: The wind speeds for this tropical cyclone/basin are based on the IMD Scale which uses 3-minute sustained winds.) | | Bangladesh, Yemen, Somalia, Sri Lanka, India | 5 | 2 | —N/a | $56.7 million | 128 | |
| South-West Indian Ocean | January – June (Note: Only systems that formed either on or after January 1, 2012 are counted in the seasonal totals.) (Note: The wind speeds for this tropical cyclone are based on Météo-France, which uses wind gusts.) | Madagascar, Mozambique, South Africa, Zimbabwe, Swaziland, Rodrigues, Malawi, Réunion | 9 | 7 | 3 | Unknown | 164 | |
| South-West Indian Ocean | July – December | Diego Garcia, Madagascar, Mauritius | 5 | 4 | 3 | $46 million | 2 | |
| Australian region | January – June | Queensland, Northern Territory, Western Australia, Solomon Islands, West Timor | 11 | 7 | 4 | $230 million | 16 | |
| Australian region | July – December | —N/a | 2 | 1 | —N/a | Unknown | Unknown | |
| South Pacific Ocean | January – June | Tonga, French Polynesia, Niue, Fiji, Vanuatu, New Caledonia, Solomon Islands, Vanuatu, New Zealand, Wallis and Futuna | 12 | 2 | 1 | $17.2 million | 18 | |
| South Pacific Ocean | July – December | Solomon Islands, Vanuatu, Fiji, Cook Islands, Samoan Islands, Wallis and Futuna, Tonga, New Zealand | 6 | 2 | 2 | $313 million | 17 | |
| Worldwide | | (See above) | 120 (Note: The sum of the number of systems in each basin will not equal the number shown as the total. This is because when systems move between basins, it creates a discrepancy in the actual number of systems.) | 86 | 48 | $94.05 billion | 3,076 (155) | |

== Notes ==
^{1} Only systems that formed either on or after January 1, 2012 are counted in the seasonal totals.
^{2} Only systems that formed either before or on December 31, 2012 are counted in the seasonal totals.
^{3} The wind speeds for this tropical cyclone/basin are based on the IMD Scale which uses 3-minute sustained winds.
^{4} The wind speeds for this tropical cyclone/basin are based on the Saffir Simpson Scale which uses 1-minute sustained winds.
^{5}The wind speeds for this tropical cyclone are based on Météo-France which uses gust winds.

== See also ==
- Tropical cyclones by year
- List of earthquakes in 2012
- Tornadoes of 2012
