= Cyclone Freda =

Category 4 South Pacific tropical cyclone in 2012–2013

Severe Tropical Cyclone Freda
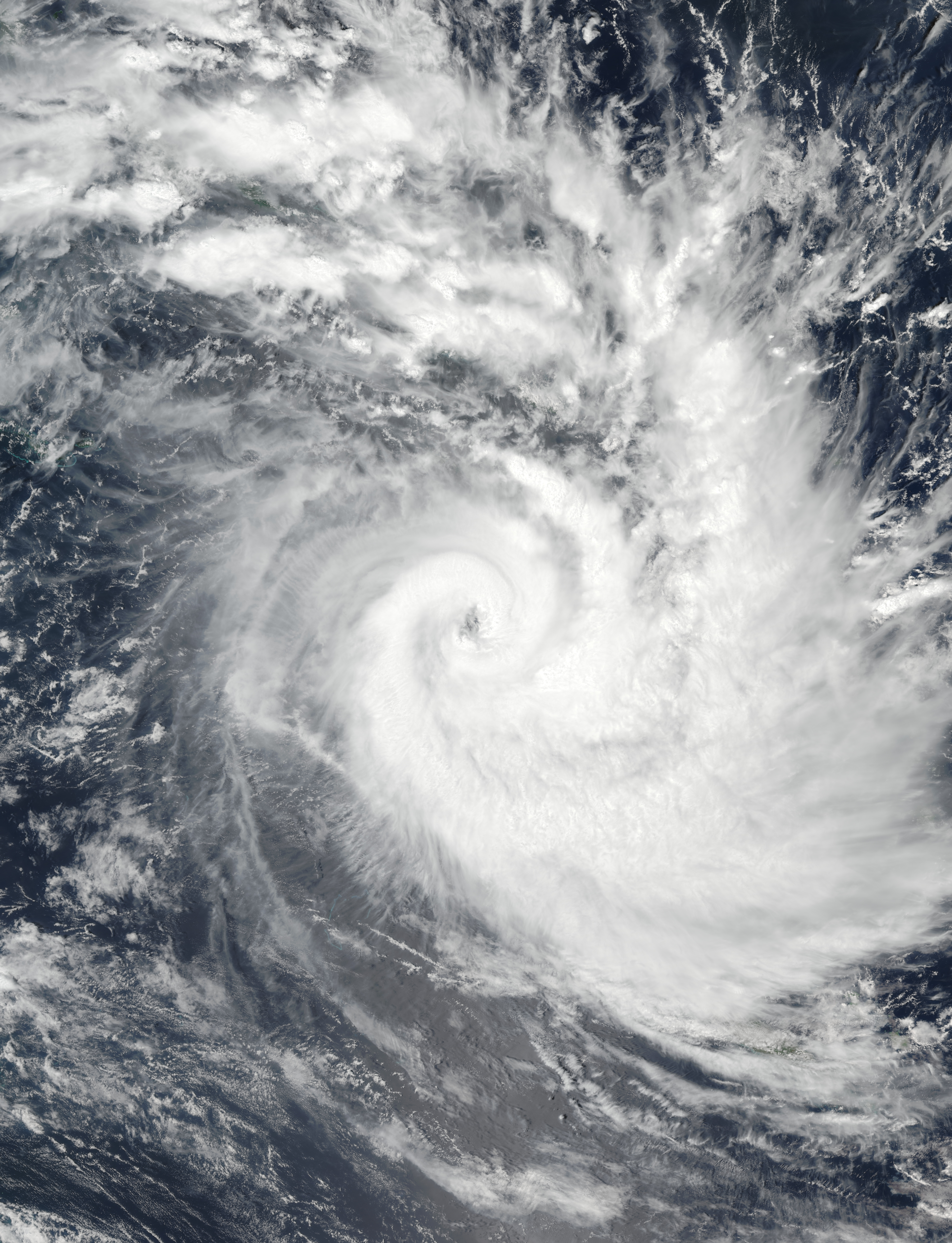
- Cyclone Freda near peak intensity on 30 December

Meteorological history
- Formed: 26 December 2012
- Dissipated: 4 January 2013

Category 4 severe tropical cyclone
- 10-minute sustained (FMS)
- Highest winds: 185 km/h (115 mph)
- Lowest pressure: 940 hPa (mbar); 27.76 inHg

Category 3-equivalent tropical cyclone
- 1-minute sustained (SSHWS/JTWC)
- Highest winds: 205 km/h (125 mph)
- Lowest pressure: 941 hPa (mbar); 27.79 inHg

Overall effects
- Fatalities: 2 total
- Areas affected: Solomon Islands, New Caledonia
- IBTrACS
- Part of the 2012–13 South Pacific and Australian region cyclone seasons

Severe Tropical Cyclone Freda was an intense tropical cyclone that developed during the 2012–13 South Pacific cyclone season and affected New Caledonia and the Solomon Islands as a weak tropical cyclone. The system that was to become Cyclone Freda was first classified on 26 December 2012, as a tropical disturbance. It gradually developed and was classified as a tropical cyclone and named Freda as it passed through the Solomon Islands on 28 December.

Within the Solomon Islands, no casualties and a moderate amount of damage were reported. In New Caledonia however, severe damage was reported after Freda had affected the territory around the new year of 2012–13. At least one person died and another went missing in New Caledonia during Freda's onslaught. As Freda passed near New Caledonia, it started to rapidly weaken and became a tropical depression by 1 January, before eventually dissipating three days later.

== Meteorological history ==
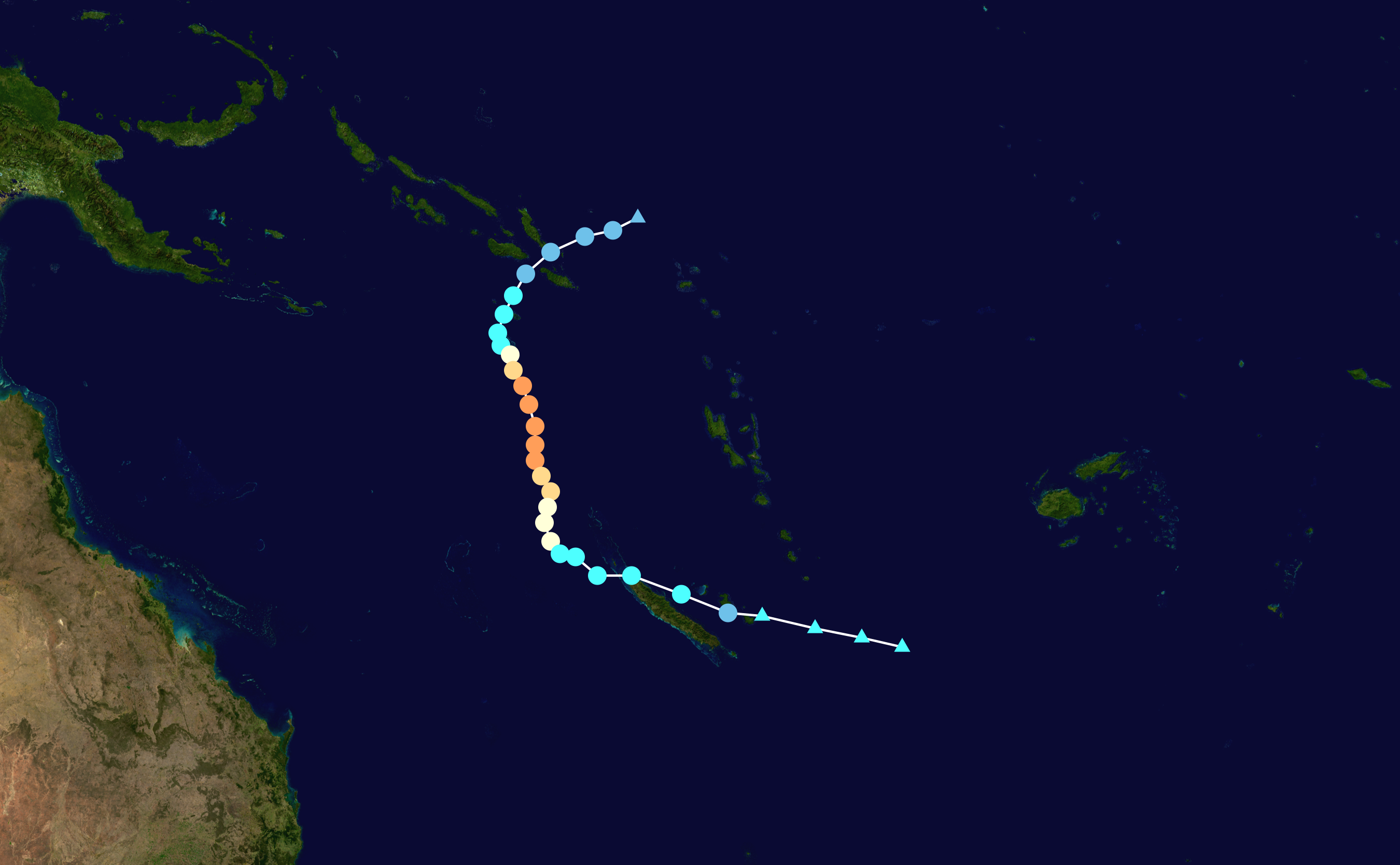
Map plotting the storm's track and intensity, according to the Saffir–Simpson scale Map key Saffir–Simpson scale Tropical depression (≤38 mph, ≤62 km/h) Tropical storm (39–73 mph, 63–118 km/h) Category 1 (74–95 mph, 119–153 km/h) Category 2 (96–110 mph, 154–177 km/h) Category 3 (111–129 mph, 178–208 km/h) Category 4 (130–156 mph, 209–251 km/h) Category 5 (≥157 mph, ≥252 km/h) Unknown Storm type Tropical cyclone Subtropical cyclone Extratropical cyclone, remnant low, tropical disturbance, or monsoon depression

On 26 December 2012, the Fiji Meteorological Service's Regional Specialized Meteorological Centre in Nadi (RSMC Nadi) reported that Tropical Disturbance 05F had developed within an area of low to moderate vertical windshear about 1075 km (670 mi) to the north of Port Vila, Vanuatu. During that day, as the system moved towards the west, convection surrounding the centre and the general organization of the system increased, before RSMC Nadi reported that the system had developed into a tropical depression. During 27 December, the depression started to move towards the southwest and the southern Solomon Islands, as convection surrounding the centre and the general organization of the system continued to increase. The system then passed near the Southern Solomon Islands early the next day, before the United States Joint Typhoon Warning Center (JTWC) designated the depression as Tropical Cyclone 06P and initiated advisories on it, as the system had become equivalent to a tropical storm. Later that day, RSMC Nadi reported that the depression had become a category one tropical cyclone on the Australian tropical cyclone intensity scale and named it Freda, as it continued to move towards the southwest and passed near Rennell Island. During 29 December, Freda continued to move towards the south-southwest, crossed 160°E and briefly moved into the Australian region, before it started to move towards the south-southeast along the western edge of the subtropical ridge of high pressure and moved back into the South Pacific basin. During that day the system developed a 20 km (10 mi) wide eye while significantly intensifying further, with RSMC Nadi reporting by 18:00 UTC that Freda had become a category 3 severe tropical cyclone with 10-minute sustained winds of 150 km/h (95 mph).

During 30 December, Freda continued to intensify further before RSMC Nadi reported at 12:00 UTC that Freda had peaked with 10-minute sustained windspeeds of 185 km/h (115 mph), which made it a category 4 severe tropical cyclone. The JTWC subsequently followed suit six hours later and reported that Freda had peaked with 1-minute sustained windspeeds of 205 km/h (125 mph), which made it equivalent to a category 3 hurricane on the Saffir-Simpson hurricane scale. After it had peaked, Freda quickly weakened as it continued to move towards the south-southeast, as vertical windshear over the system increased and caused convection over Freda's northern semicircle to gradually wear away. By 00:00 UTC on 1 January, the JTWC reported that Freda had become equivalent to a category 1 hurricane, while RSMC Nadi reported that the system had weakened into a category 2 tropical cyclone. Throughout that day, Freda continued to weaken. At 18:00 UTC, after deep convection had become displaced to the east of the low level circulation center, RSMC Nadi reported that the cyclone had weakened into a tropical depression. During the next day, the JTWC issued their final advisory on the system after the low level circulation center had become fully exposed before the remnant tropical depression crossed the northern part of New Caledonia's Grande Terre island. After crossing New Caledonia's biggest island, Freda started to move towards the southeast between Grande Terre and the Loyalty Islands, while the JTWC reported that Freda had become a subtropical cyclone, as it was positioned under a strong subtropical westerly flow. The remnant tropical depression was subsequently last noted on 4 January, as it dissipated about 630 km (390 mi) to the southwest of Nadi, Fiji.

== Preparations and impact ==
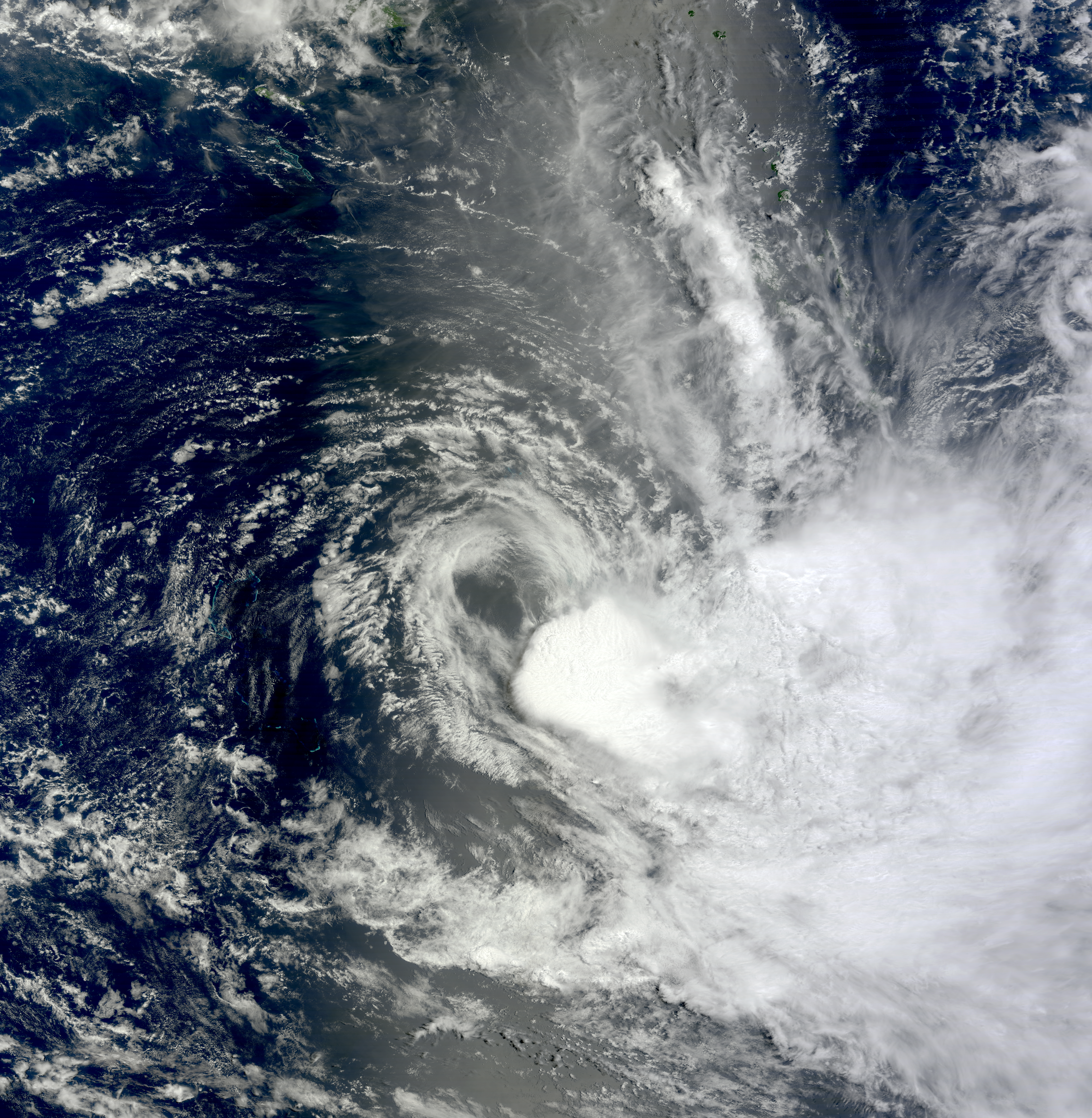
A disorganized Cyclone Freda approaching New Caledonia on 1 January

=== The Solomon Islands ===
Cyclone Freda caused a moderate amount of damage when it affected the Solomon Islands between 27 and 30 December, with wind speeds of up to 130 km/h (80 mph). Ahead of the system reaching the country, the Solomon Islands Meteorological Service issued various tropical disturbance and tropical cyclone watches and warnings for parts of the archipelago, including the islands of Makira, Malaita, Guadalcanal, Temotu, Sikaiana, Rennell and Bellona. Within the Solomon Islands, winds of up to 130 km/h (80 mph) whipped roofs of houses and flattened trees, while heavy rain caused rivers to rise and flood. The provinces of Makira and Ulawa were the worst affected, with damage to infrastructure, food gardens and shelters reported. Several food gardens and houses were also destroyed on the island of Guadalcanal, while other provinces including Malaita, Temotu, Isabel and Central provinces reported minimal damage or no damage at all.

Freda brought strong winds and rain that flattened trees and lifted roofs. Makira Island was hardest hit, with rising rivers flooding some areas.

Most of the damage in the Solomon Islands was from widespread flooding in remote outlying islands, while there were no reports of any casualties.

On 31 December, the Solomon Islands National Disaster Management Office approved a $3.7 million budget for work programmes, transport, logistics and food relief supplies to deal with the damage left behind by Cyclone Freda.

=== New Caledonia ===
On 29 December, the French High Commissioner for New Caledonia placed the whole of the archipelago under a pre-alert, as Freda was expected to generate heavy rain and disrupt New Year's Eve celebrations.

Within New Caledonia, the strongest winds were observed on Grand Terre's south-southwestern coast, with a maximum gust of 154 km/h (96 mph) and a rainfall amount of 438 mm (17.2 in) were recorded at the Goro weather station.

One man drowned in high seas whipped up by Freda, while another went missing after attempting to cross a swollen river.

== See also ==
- Tropical cyclones in 2012
- Cyclone Rewa (1993–94) – a strong, long-lived and erratic tropical cyclone which also affected New Caledonia in 1994
