= Cyclone Giovanna =

South-West Indian cyclone in 2012

Intense Tropical Cyclone Giovanna
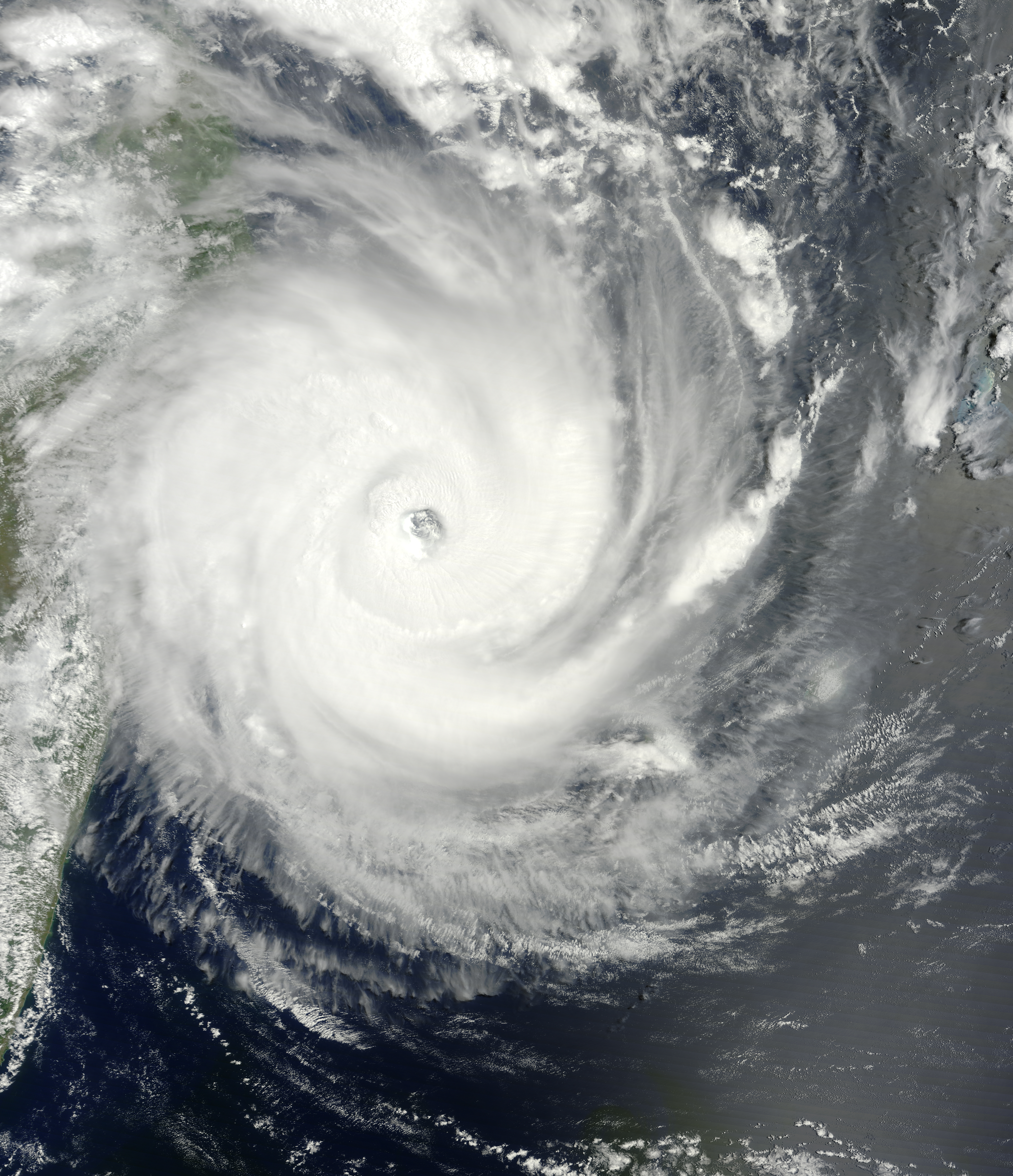
- Intense Tropical Cyclone Giovanna approaching Madagascar on 13 February

Meteorological history
- Formed: 7 February 2012
- Remnant low: 22 February 2012
- Dissipated: 24 February 2012

Intense tropical cyclone
- 10-minute sustained (MFR)
- Highest winds: 195 km/h (120 mph)
- Lowest pressure: 935 hPa (mbar); 27.61 inHg

Category 4-equivalent tropical cyclone
- 1-minute sustained (SSHWS/JTWC)
- Highest winds: 220 km/h (140 mph)
- Lowest pressure: 933 hPa (mbar); 27.55 inHg

Overall effects
- Fatalities: 35 total
- Areas affected: La Réunion, Mauritius, Madagascar
- IBTrACS
- Part of the 2011–12 South-West Indian Ocean cyclone season

Intense Tropical Cyclone Giovanna was a powerful tropical cyclone that affected Madagascar. Giovanna was the ninth tropical depression, seventh named storm, and third tropical cyclone of the 2011–12 South-West Indian Ocean cyclone season. Giovanna was blamed for 35 deaths along the Madagascar coast, La Réunion, and Mauritius, and it was the first intense tropical cyclone to impact Madagascar since Cyclone Bingiza one year earlier.

== Meteorological history ==
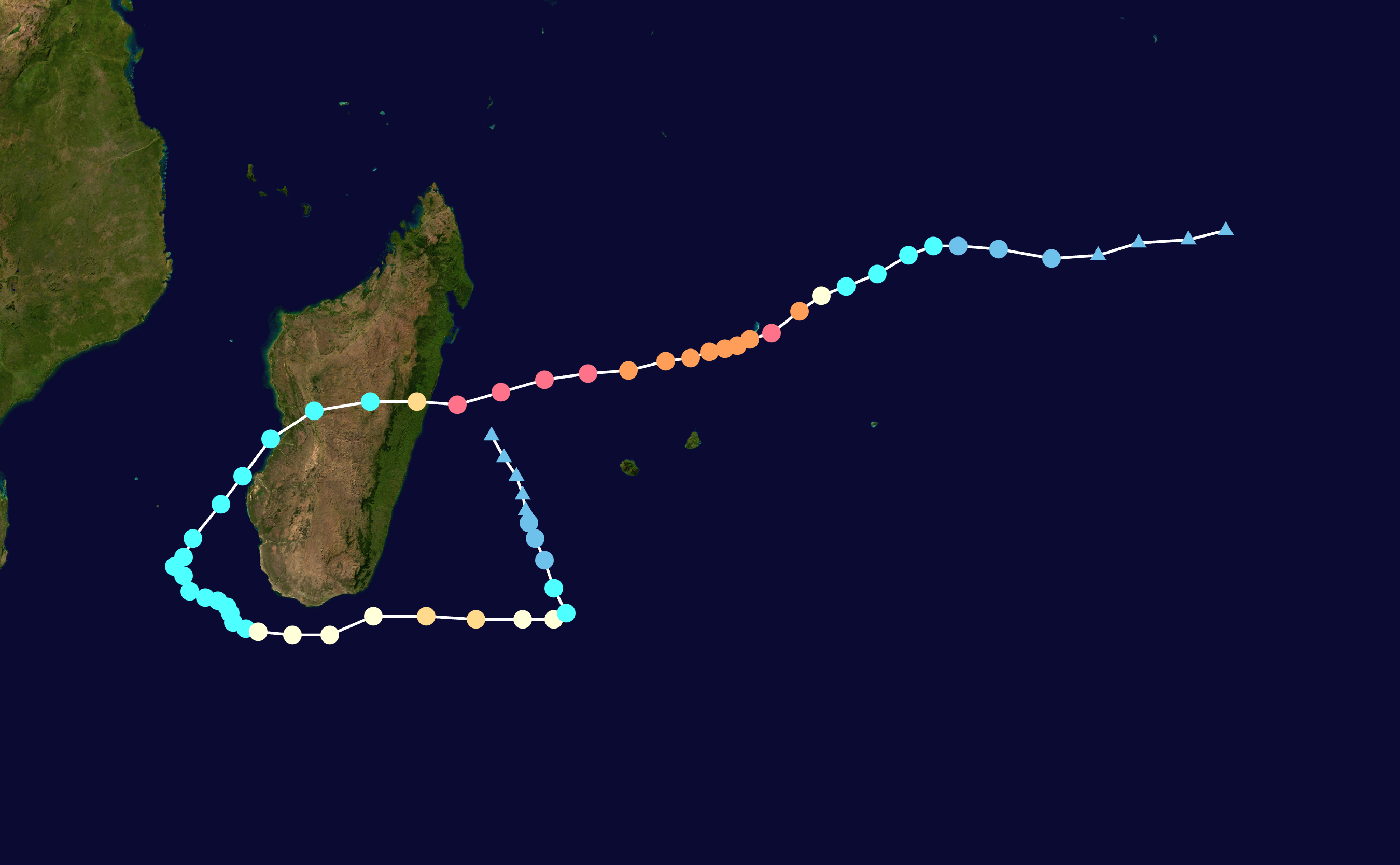
Map plotting the storm's track and intensity, according to the Saffir–Simpson scale Map key Saffir–Simpson scale Tropical depression (≤38 mph, ≤62 km/h) Tropical storm (39–73 mph, 63–118 km/h) Category 1 (74–95 mph, 119–153 km/h) Category 2 (96–110 mph, 154–177 km/h) Category 3 (111–129 mph, 178–208 km/h) Category 4 (130–156 mph, 209–251 km/h) Category 5 (≥157 mph, ≥252 km/h) Unknown Storm type Tropical cyclone Subtropical cyclone Extratropical cyclone, remnant low, tropical disturbance, or monsoon depression

Cyclone Giovanna developed from a tropical wave over the Indian Ocean heading to the southwest on 7 February. The tropical disturbance soon developed into Tropical Depression 09 on 9 February. On the same day, the Joint Typhoon Warning Center upgraded the system, giving it the designation "12S". The storm intensified into a moderate tropical storm and was given the name Giovanna. On 10 February, Giovanna continued to strengthen into a severe tropical storm. Later the same day, Giovanna went through a rapid intensification period and became an intense tropical cyclone, due to favorable environmental conditions.

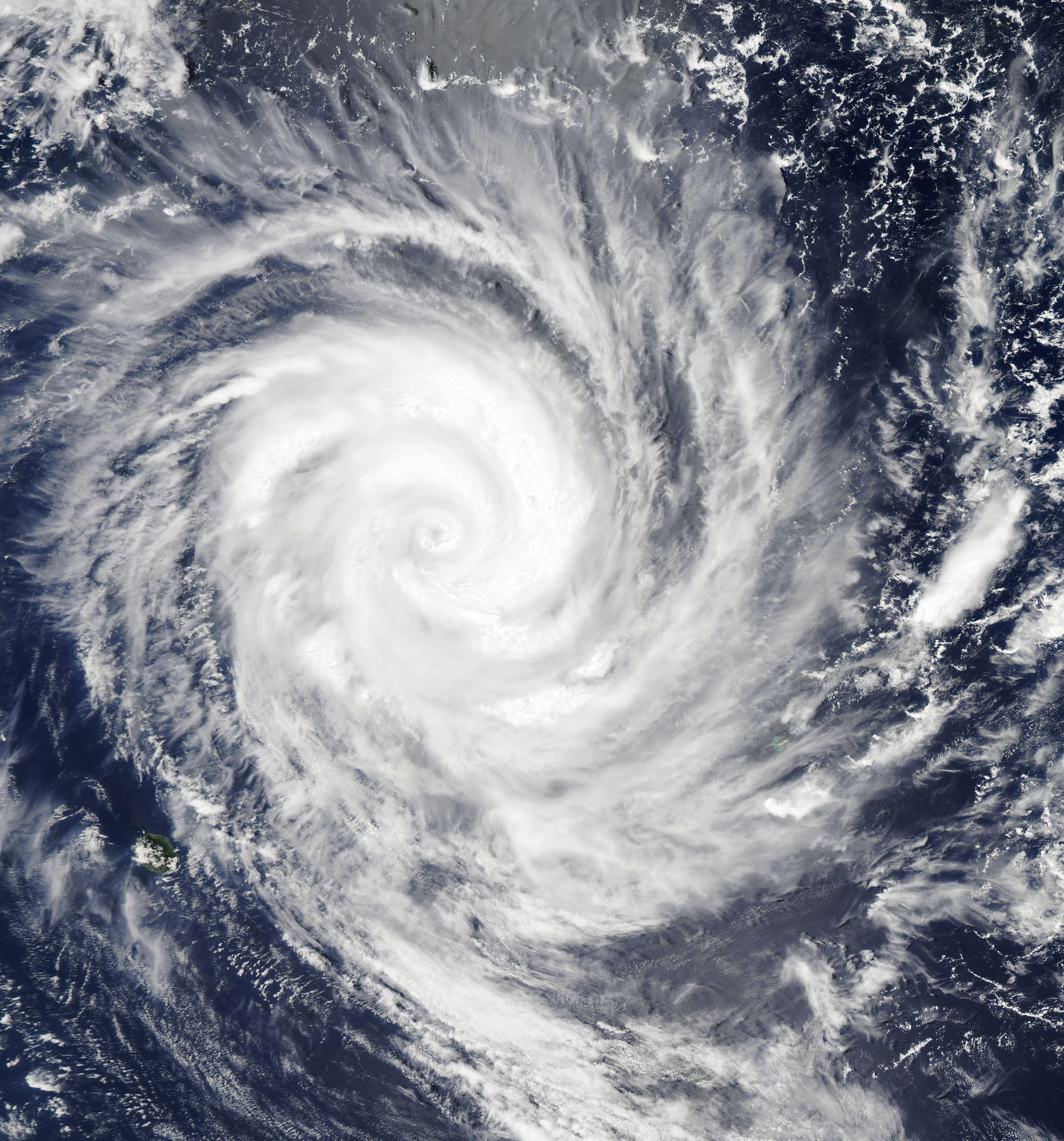
Cyclone Giovanna with a double eyewall while undergoing an eyewall replacement cycle

Soon, Giovanna began an eyewall replacement cycle and weakened into a Category 3-equivalent tropical cyclone on 11 February, due to high wind shear around the system. However, the wind shear surrounding the storm soon weakened, and Giovanna was able to restrengthen back into an intense tropical cyclone as it finished the eyewall replacement cycle, resulting with a new, larger eye 50 kilometres (31 mi) across.

At about 2200 UTC on February 13 (0100 EAT February 14), Giovanna made landfall at Andevoranto, Madagascar. Giovanna then weakened into an overland tropical depression on 14 February. Early on 15 February, Giovanna moved back out into open water, and drifted southwestward over the next few days. On February 18, Giovanna turned eastwards, and the storm was steered into warmer waters off the southern coast of Madagascar by a strong anticyclone located to the south. Giovanna strengthened into a Category 2 tropical cyclone again and developed a small eye. However, the eye soon underwent another eyewall replacement cycle, and again began to weaken. On February 20, Giovanna entered an area of strong vertical wind shear, which displaced the system's convection to the south of the circulation center and quickly weakened the system into a tropical depression. On 22 February, the continued strong shear caused Giovanna to degenerate into a remnant low. The remnants of the storm moved further northwestward the next day, due to a Fujiwhara interaction with a stronger system to the east, Moderate Tropical Storm Hilwa, and late on 24 February, Giovanna's remnants dissipated east of Madagascar.

== Preparation and impact ==
Large waves estimated up to 8 m (26 ft) high affected the coast of Reunion and resulted in one fatality after a man was swept out to sea. Another fatality took place in Mauritius after a man lost control of his motorcycle during poor weather and crashed into an electricity pylon.

At least 33 people were killed by Giovanna in Madagascar. Flooding and strong winds were the main destructive forces, besides the storm surge which floods many coastal areas. Thousands of people were affected by this cyclone all across Madagascar with, flooding and strong winds which mostly caused 60% of homes to be damaged or destroyed. Two villages on small islands near Madagascar were reportedly "wiped off the map." Reports indicated that 75 to 90% of structures in those areas were destroyed by the storm.

== See also ==
- Tropical cyclones in 2012
- Cyclone Enawo (2017)
- Cyclone Batsirai (2022) – had a similar path and intensity and occurred almost exactly ten years after
