= Hurricane Bud (2012) =

Category 3 Pacific hurricane in 2012

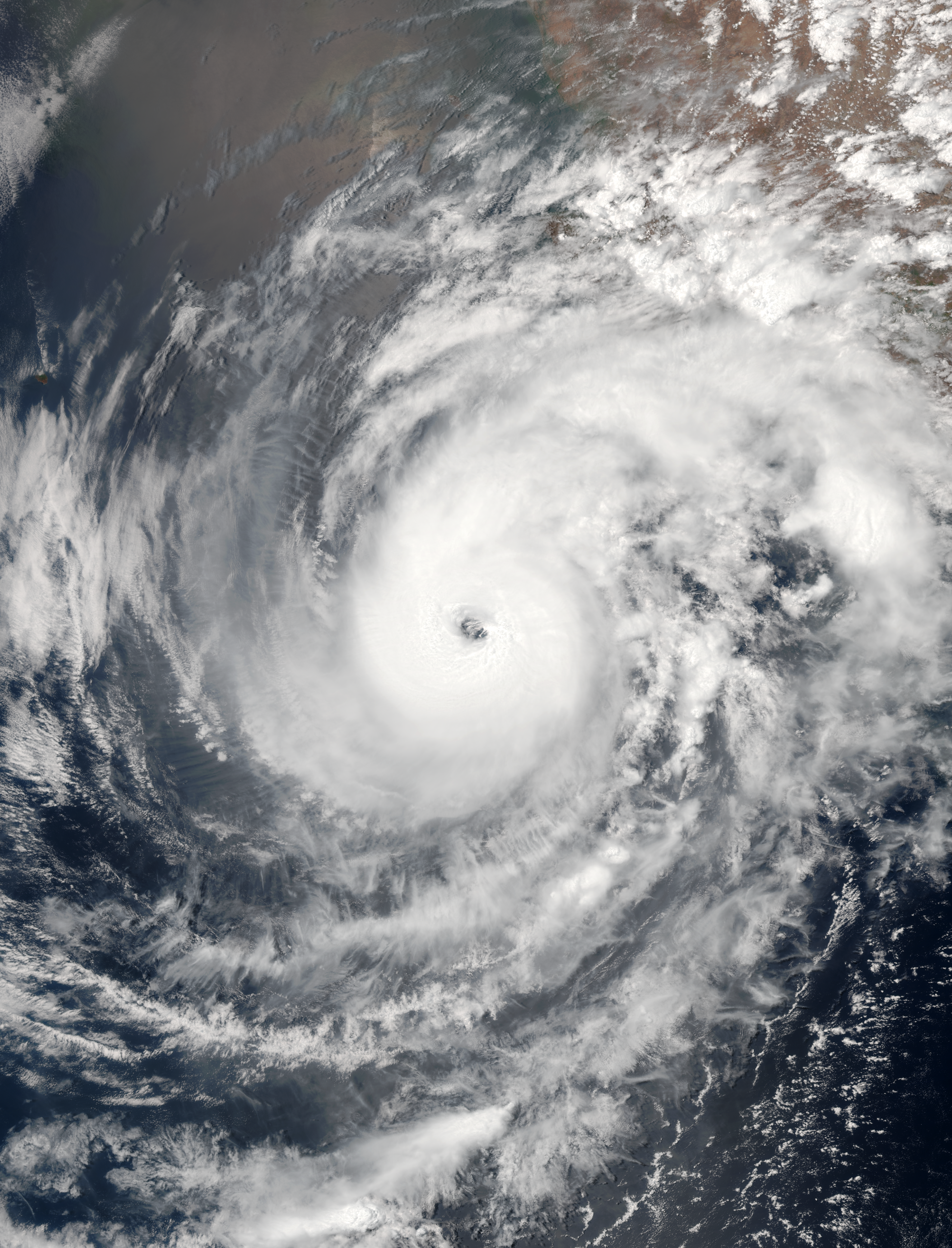
- Bud near peak intensity on May 24

Meteorological history
- Formed: May 20, 2012
- Dissipated: May 26, 2012

Category 3 major hurricane
- 1-minute sustained (SSHWS/NWS)
- Highest winds: 115 mph (185 km/h)
- Lowest pressure: 961 mbar (hPa); 28.38 inHg

Overall effects
- Fatalities: None
- Damage: Minimal
- Areas affected: Western Mexico
- IBTrACS /
- Part of the 2012 Pacific hurricane season

Hurricane Bud was a rare May major hurricane that skirted areas of the western Mexican coast. The second tropical cyclone and named storm of the 2012 Pacific hurricane season, Bud developed slowly into a tropical depression from a low-pressure area, centered well south of Mexico on May 20. It moved generally west-northwestward and by the following day, strengthened into Tropical Storm Bud. Thereafter, further intensification was slow. By late on May 23, Bud reached winds of 65 mph (105 km/h). On the following day, however, rapid deepening commenced, with the storm becoming a hurricane on that day. Bud peaked as a 115 mph (185 km/h) Category 3 hurricane on May 25. Several hours after reaching that intensity, the storm began to quickly weaken as it moved near Western Mexico. Bud continued to weaken, eventually dissipating the next day.

Due to Hurricane Bud's rapid weakening offshore of Mexico, effects were mostly minimal. However, the hurricane still produced heavy rainfall and waves of up to 6 ft (1.8 m) in Melaque. Beach damage resulted from the rough seas. Strong gusts also uprooted trees across the coast, and rainfall washed out some roads. No deaths were associated with the hurricane's impacts.

== Meteorological history ==
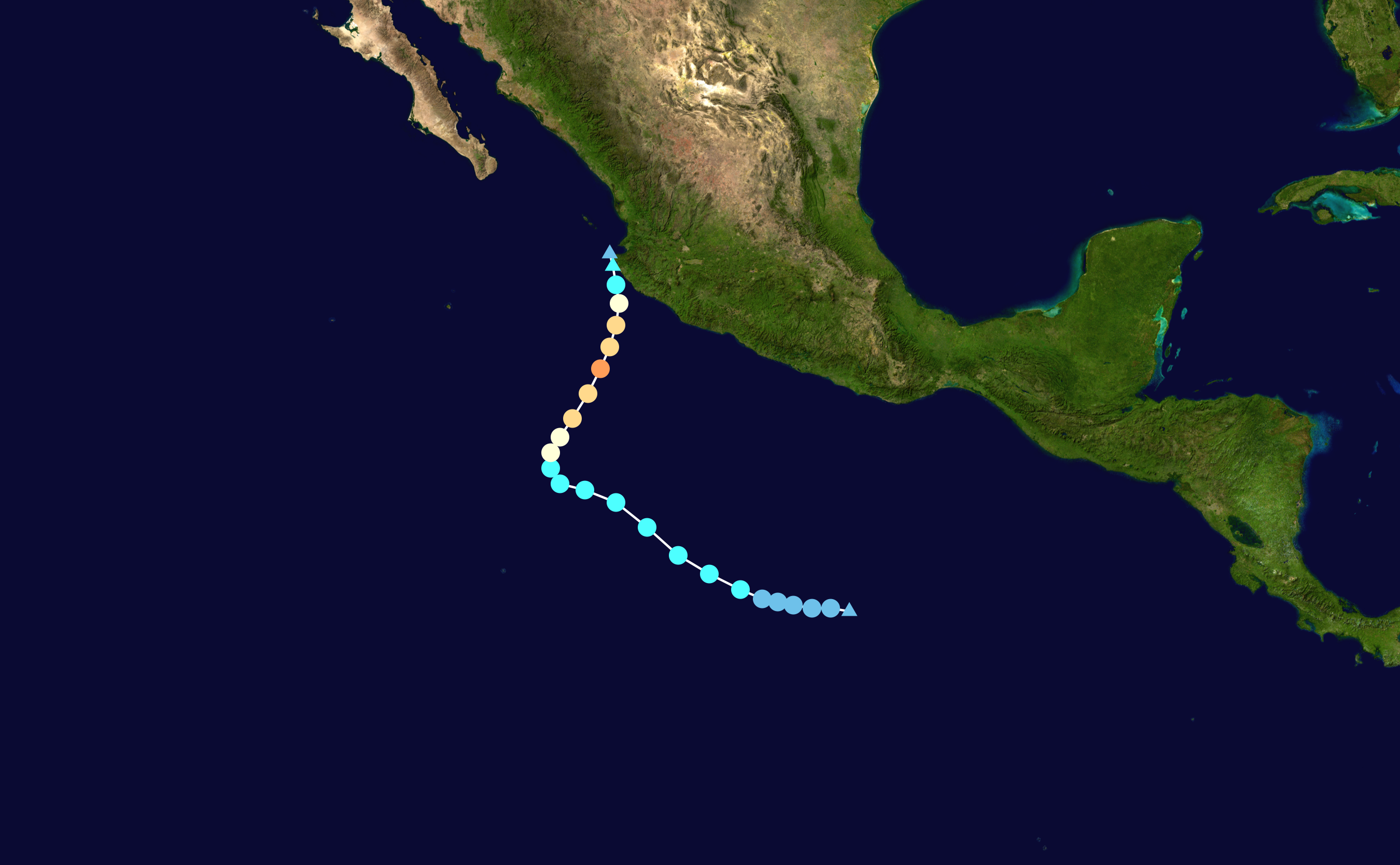
Map plotting the storm's track and intensity, according to the Saffir–Simpson scale Map key Saffir–Simpson scale Tropical depression (≤38 mph, ≤62 km/h) Tropical storm (39–73 mph, 63–118 km/h) Category 1 (74–95 mph, 119–153 km/h) Category 2 (96–110 mph, 154–177 km/h) Category 3 (111–129 mph, 178–208 km/h) Category 4 (130–156 mph, 209–251 km/h) Category 5 (≥157 mph, ≥252 km/h) Unknown Storm type Tropical cyclone Subtropical cyclone Extratropical cyclone, remnant low, tropical disturbance, or monsoon depression

The precursor to Hurricane Bud exited the West Africa coast on May 5 as a tropical wave. The wave slowly intensified as it moved towards the west as an area of thunderstorms, producing showers of the Windward Islands. On May 12, a low pressure system formed from the tropical wave just south of eastern Panama. Under favorable conditions, it slowly began to organize while east of Tropical Storm Aletta, and after a burst in convection on May 15, the National Hurricane Center began monitoring the system. By early on May 18, the system became nearly stationary while just offshore of Mexico. After wind shear caused it to become less organized later that day, the system began showing signs of development starting on May 19. Although it was re-organizing, the system initially lacked a well-defined surface circulation. On May 20, the system started to rapidly organize while tracking slowly west-northwestward. Later that day, the National Hurricane Center noted that "conditions appear favorable for a tropical depression to form tonight or Monday." It is estimated that Tropical Depression Two-E developed at 1800 UTC on May 20, while located about 525 miles (845 km) south of Acapulco, Guerrero. Although geostationary and microwave satellite imagery indicated moderate easterly wind shear, the National Hurricane Center predicted quick intensification into a hurricane.

As the depression slightly accelerated to the west, the storm continued to organize, eventually intensifying into Tropical Storm Bud on May 22, with 40 mph (64 km/h) sustained winds. Bud remained at this intensity for one day before strengthening, starting early on May 23, and reached winds of 65 mph (105 km/h) during the afternoon. By the morning of May 24, Bud continued its rapid intensification, reaching sustained winds of 85 mph (137 km/h), and then 110 mph (180 km/h) by the afternoon, as the system turned northward. Later on the same day, Bud turned to the northeast, and began to approach the coast of Western Mexico. Late on May 24, Bud intensified further into a Category 3 Major Hurricane, and obtained a peak intensity of 115 mph winds (185 km/h), with a minimum central low pressure of 960 mbars. Hurricane Bud was able to maintain Category 3 intensity for the next several hours, even when its outer rainbands began moving onshore in Western Mexico. Very early on May 25, Hurricane Bud weakened into a strong Category 2 hurricane.

Hurricane Bud rapidly began to weaken, as it slowly moved onshore. Bud quickly lost most of its convection, which was sheared mainly to the north. During the mid-afternoon of May 25, Bud weakened down to a strong tropical storm, as it began making landfall on Western Mexico. Further weakening ensued over the next 24 hours, and Bud degenerated into a remnant low early on May 26. Late on May 26, the remnant low of Hurricane Bud dissipated completely.

== Preparations and impact ==
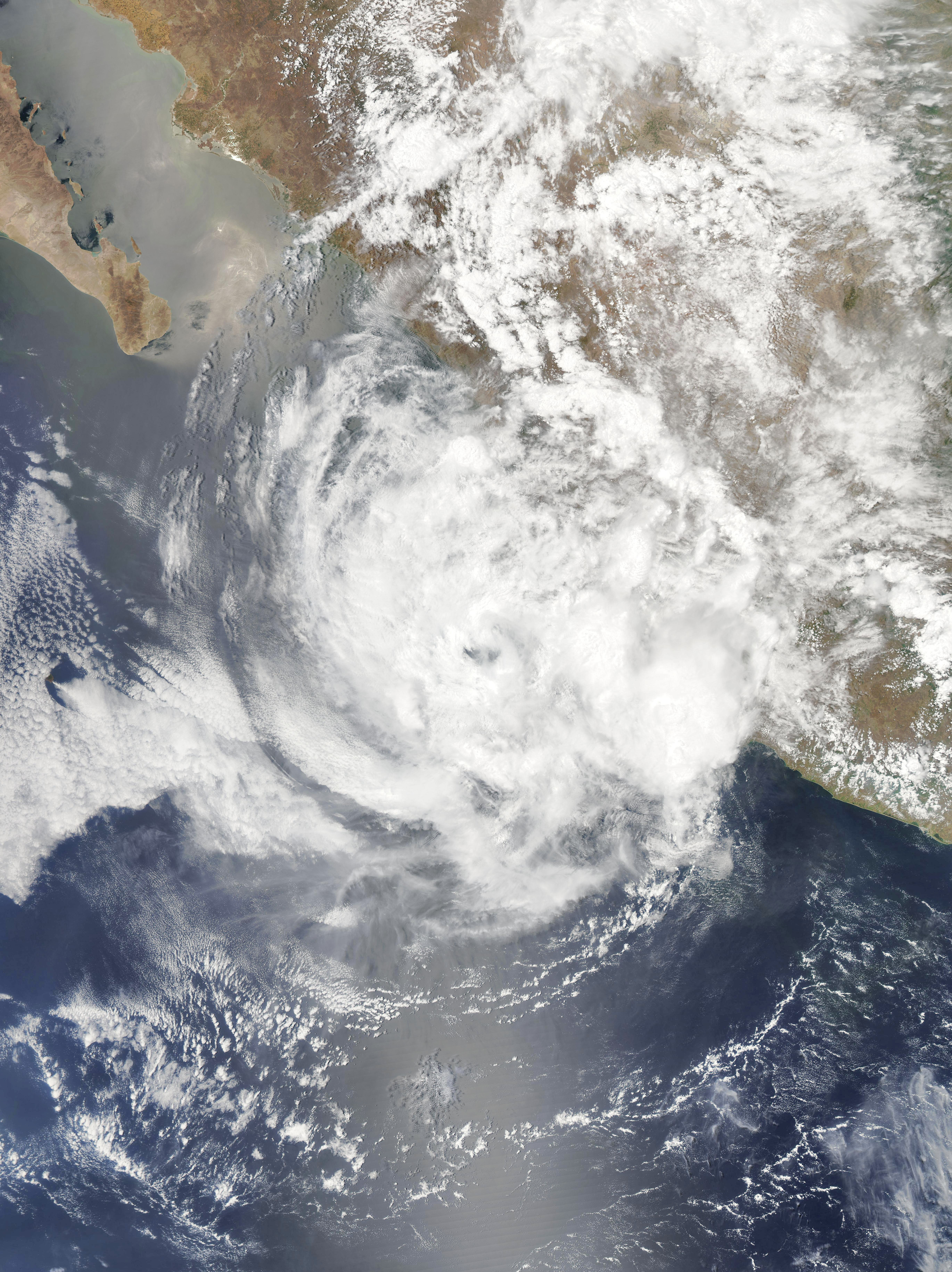
Hurricane Bud approaching Western Mexico on May 25

By early on May 24, the Government of Mexico issued a tropical storm watch from Punta San Telmo to La Fortuna. Later that day, the watch was replaced by a warning and extended to Cabo Corrientes, while a hurricane watch was issued for the same area. By 2100 UTC on May 24, the existing portions of the warnings between Cabo Corrientes and Manzanillo were upgraded to a hurricane warning, and another tropical storm watch was issued northward to San Blas. In the event of evacuations, 11 schools in Colima and Jalisco were closed. The port of Manzanillo closed due to the threat of rains. Officials in Puerto Vallarta temporarily banned swimming in the ocean. Hundreds of heavy vehicles were prepared in Jalisco to move debris. Authorities opened a total of 898 shelters in Guerrero and around 200 shelters in Colima.

Prior to Bud's rapid dissipation offshore, the storm produced heavy rainfall and waves of 6 feet (1.8 m) in Melaque, a town in western Jalisco. To prevent overflowing, government officials opened a full lagoon in Melague. Wind gusts reached 55 mph (89 km/h) in Manzanillo, strong enough to knock down trees. The storm washed out roads in Mazanillo, but no rivers overflowed. Further north, there was moderate beach damage. Overall. damage from Bud was minimal.
