= Timeline of the 2012 North Indian Ocean cyclone season =

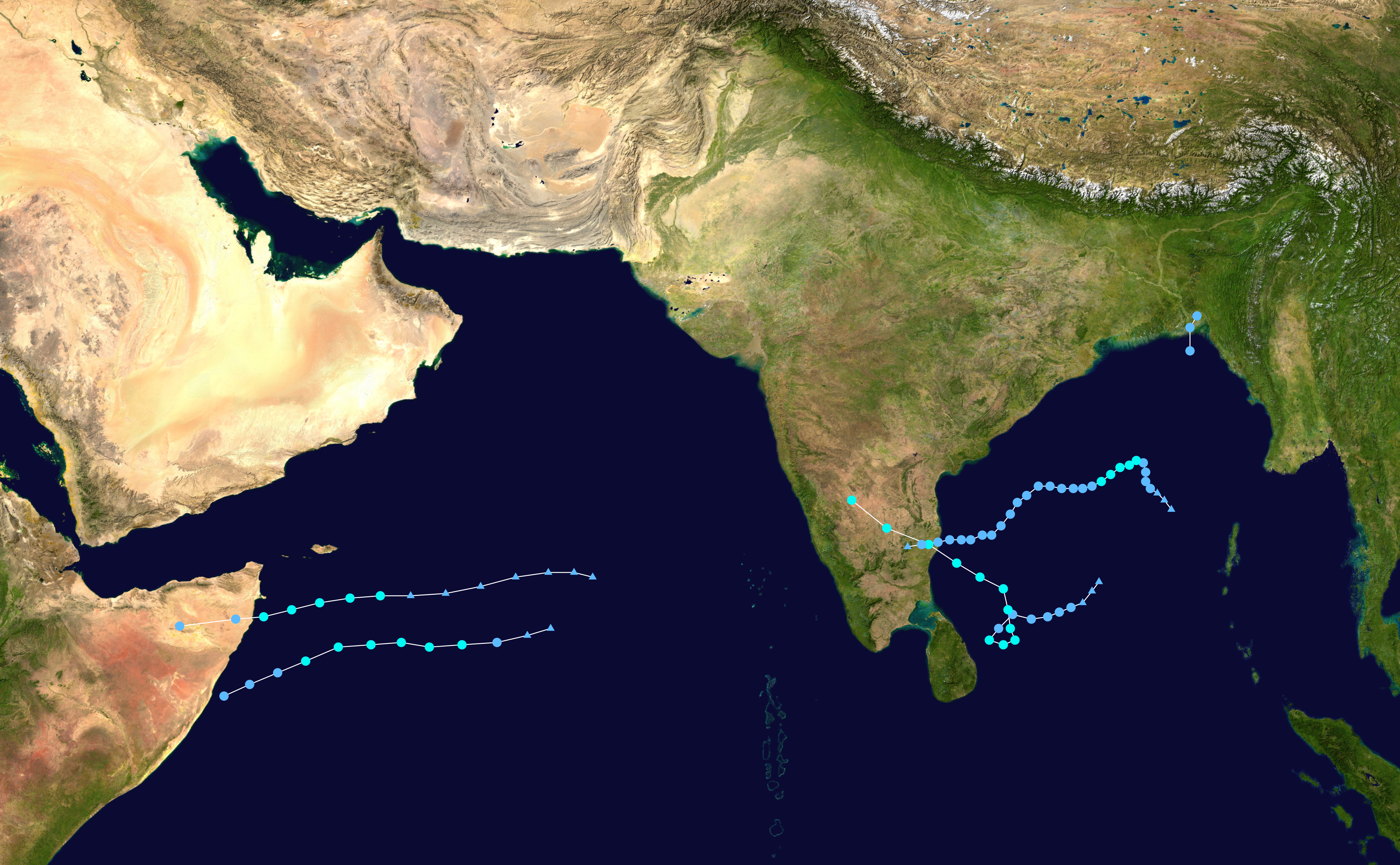
Track map of all North Indian Ocean tropical cyclones so far in 2012

The 2012 North Indian Ocean cyclone season was an event in the annual cycle of tropical cyclone formation. The scope of this article is limited to the Indian Ocean in the Northern Hemisphere, east of the Horn of Africa and west of the Malay Peninsula. There are two main seas in the North Indian Ocean — the Arabian Sea to the west of the Indian subcontinent, abbreviated ARB by the India Meteorological Department (IMD); and the Bay of Bengal to the east, abbreviated BOB by the IMD. The official Regional Specialized Meteorological Centre in this basin is the India Meteorological Department (IMD), while the Joint Typhoon Warning Center releases unofficial advisories. This timeline includes information that was operationally released, meaning that data from post-storm reviews by the IMD, such as a storm that was not operationally warned upon, has not been included. This timeline documents tropical cyclone formations, strengthening, weakening, landfalls, and dissipations during the season.

This season, 3 depressions developed out of the low-pressure areas and the remnants of former tropical cyclones. 2 of those depressions strengthened into deep depressions, and both of those storms intensified further into Cyclonic Storms. The first depression of the season developed out of the remnants of Severe Tropical Storm Gaemi on October 10, 2012, very late into the 2012 cyclone season, about 350 km (215 mi) southeast of Kolkata, West Bengal. The depression brought high winds and heavy rains to much of Bangladesh, causing extensive damage. The storm killed a total of 30 people. On October 23, the second depression of the season formed. It developed out of a persistent low in the Arabian Sea. A day later, the depression became the first cyclonic storm of the season, and was named Murjan. It became the first storm to impact the Horn of Africa since Bandu in 2010. Overall, Murjan lasted two and a half days before dissipating over Nugaal region in northeastern Somalia. Only two days later, the third depression of the season formed in southern Bay of Bengal. It eventually strengthened into Cyclonic Storm Nilam, and it made landfall over Southern India early on October 31. Moving further inland, the storm affected two states and caused widespread flooding. Thereafter, Nilam weakened gradually and dissipated on November 2.

== Timeline of events ==
=== October ===
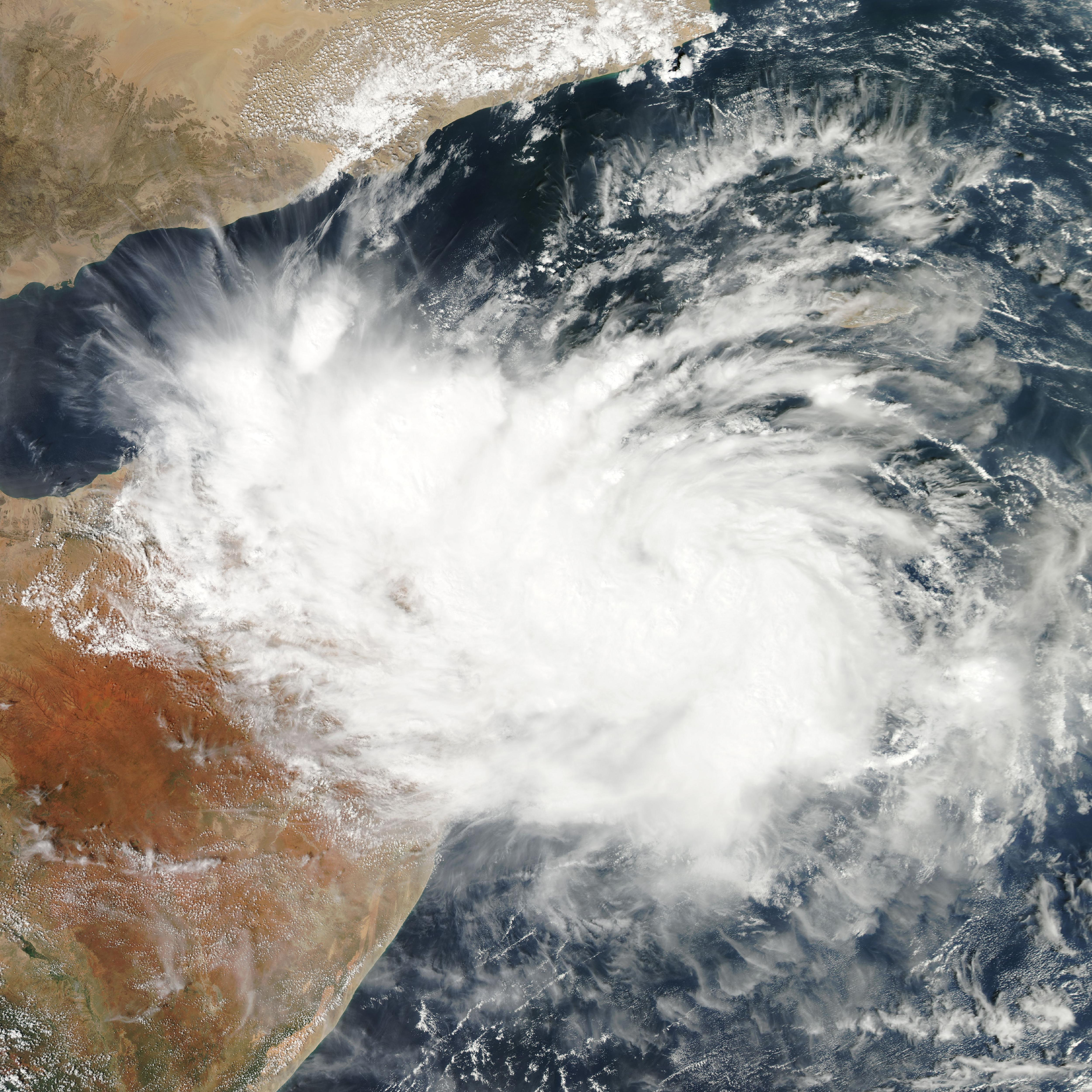
Cyclonic Storm Murjan at peak intensity

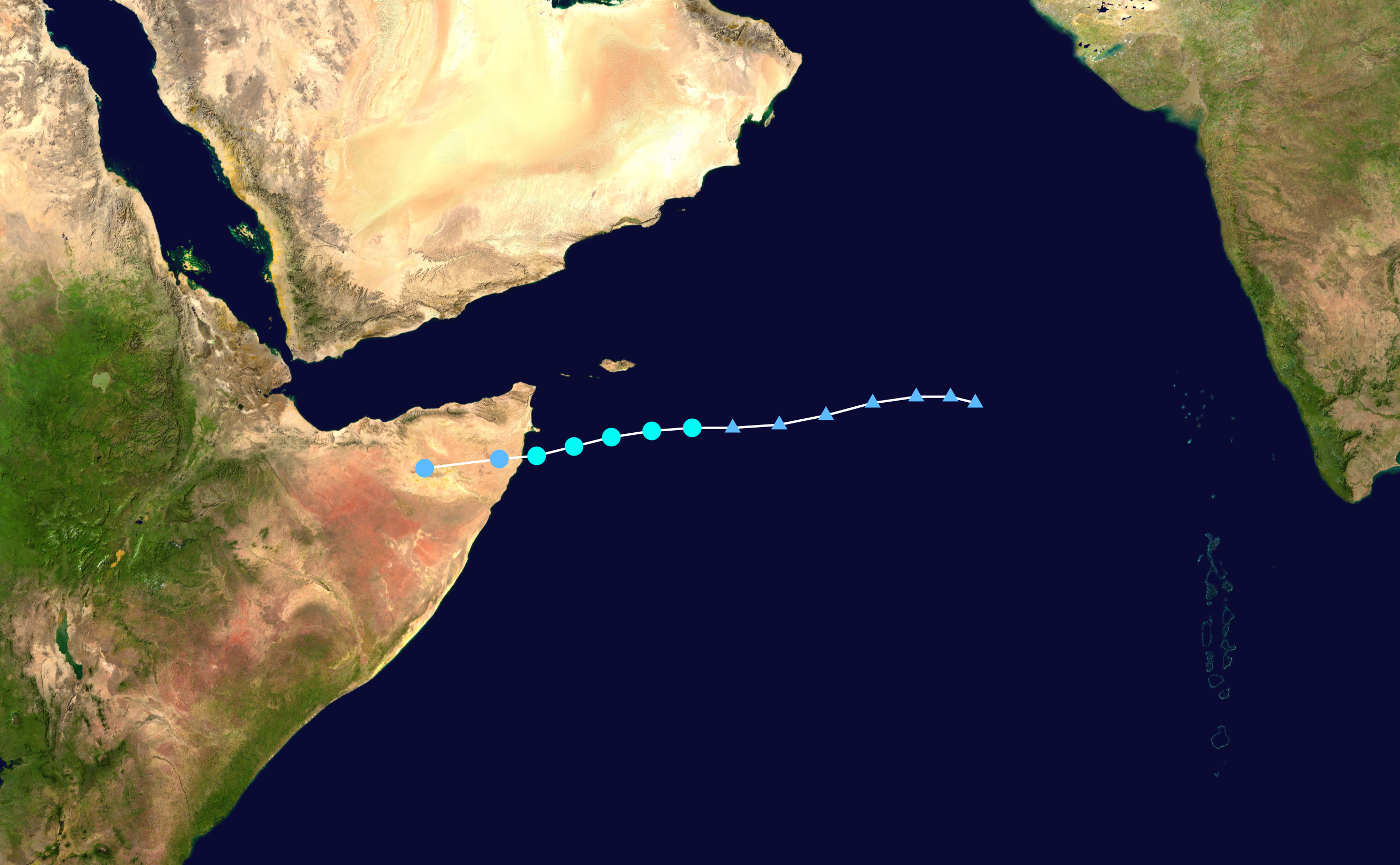
Track map of Cyclonic Storm Murjan

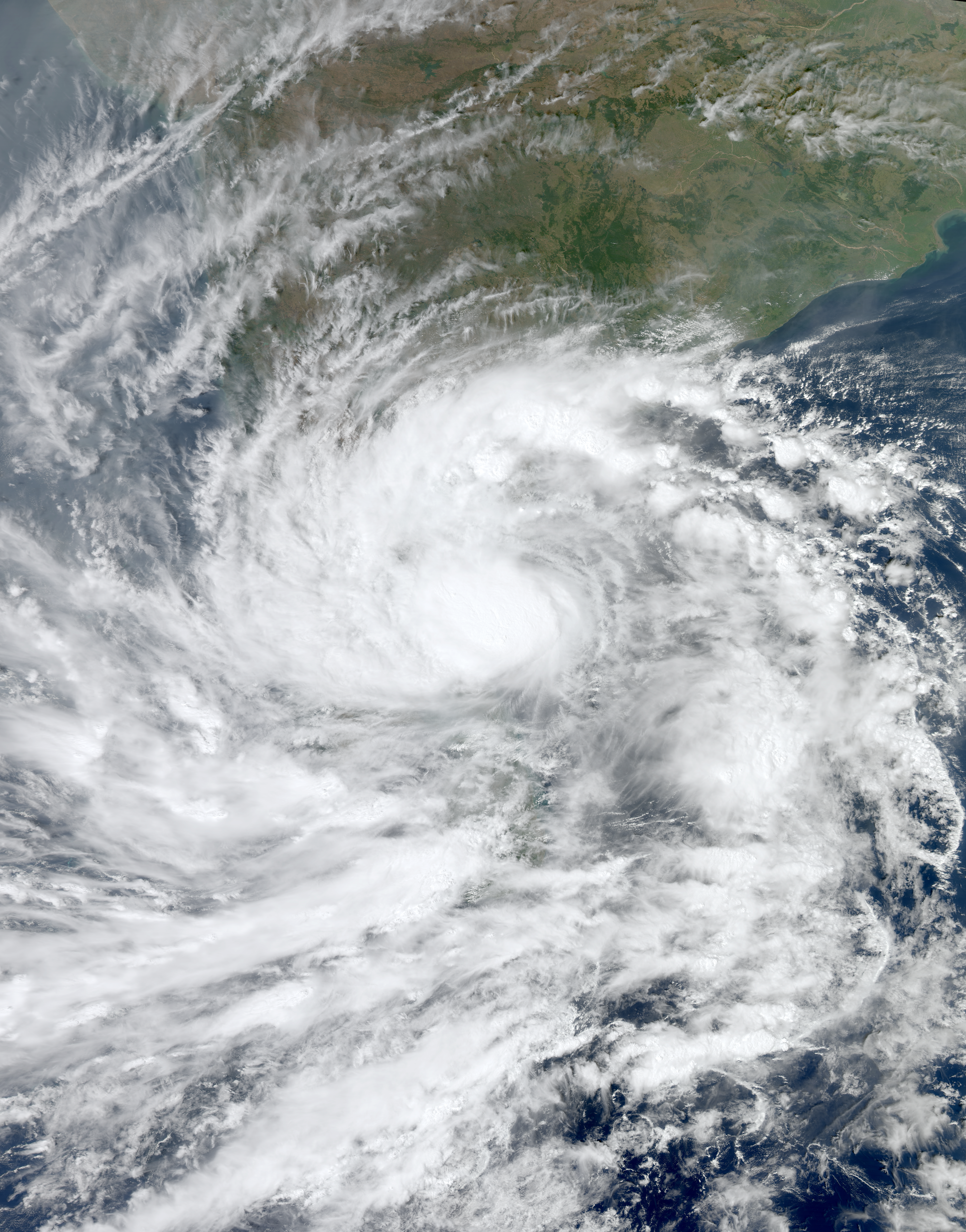
Cyclonic Storm Nilam at peak intensity

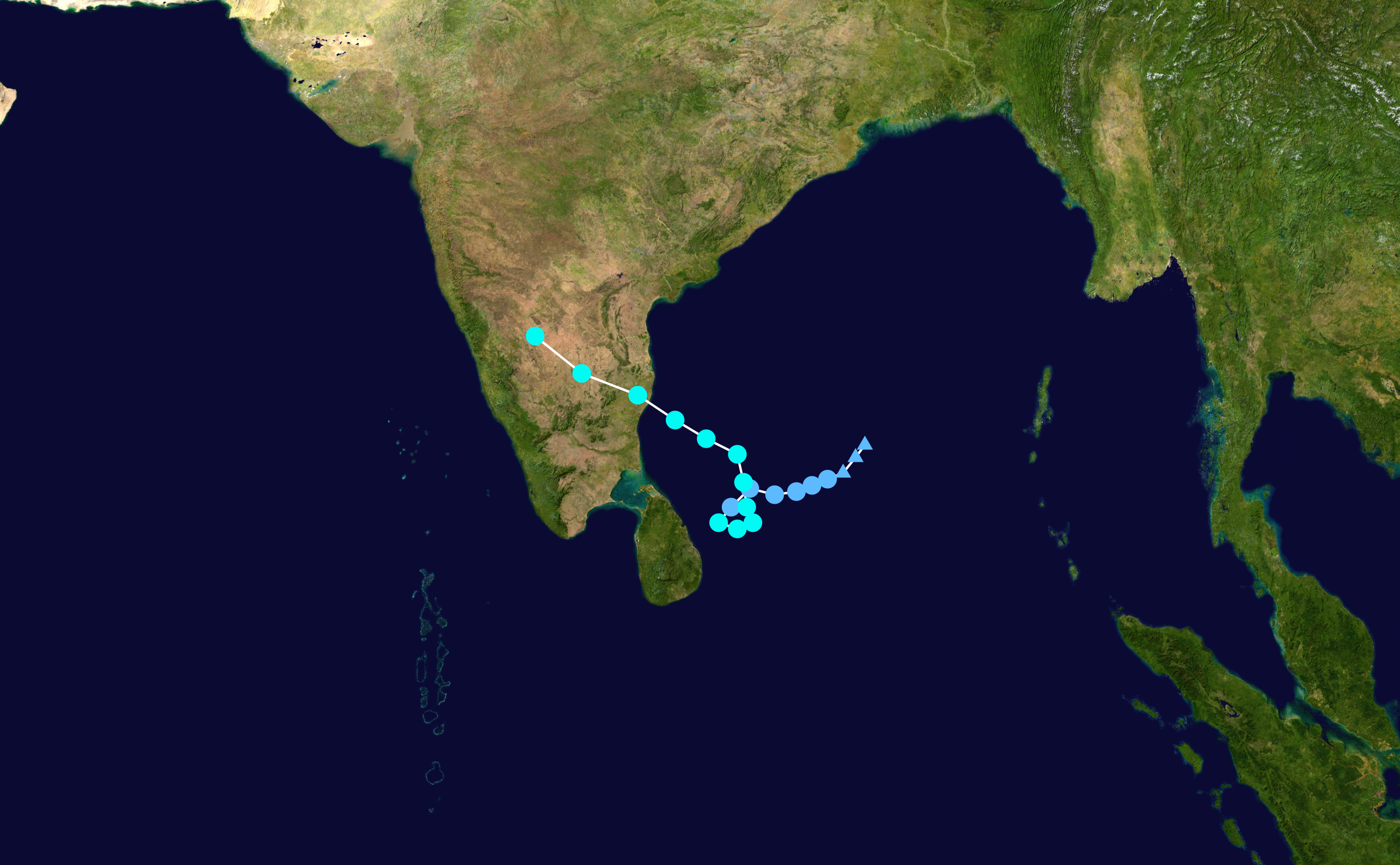
Track map of Cyclonic Storm Nilam

October 10

- 1500 UTC (8:30 p.m. IST) – Depression BOB 01 develops from an area of low pressure roughly 350 km (215 mi) southeast of Kolkata, West Bengal, associated with the remnants of Severe Tropical Storm Gaemi.

October 11

- 0600 UTC (11:30 a.m. IST) – Depression BOB 01 strengthens into a Deep Depression and makes landfall over Bangladesh coast near Hatiya.
- 0830 UTC (02:00 a.m. IST) – Deep Depression BOB 01 loses strength after land interaction and dissipates into an area of low pressure.

October 23

- 0600 UTC (11:30 a.m. IST) – Depression ARB 01 develops from an area of low pressure located about 800 km (495 mi) to the west of India's Amindivi Islands.
- 1800 UTC (11:30 p.m. IST) – Depression ARB 01 strengthens into a Deep Depression while the Joint Typhoon Warning Center issues a Tropical Cyclone Formation Alert on it.

October 24

- 1200 UTC (05:30 p.m. IST) – Deep Depression ARB 01 strengthens into the first cyclonic storm of the season with 3-minute sustained winds of 35 knots (65 km/h; 40 mph) and is officially named Murjan.
- 1500 UTC (08:30 p.m. IST) – The JTWC starts monitoring Murjan as a Tropical Storm with 1-minute sustained winds of 35 knots (65 km/h; 40 mph).

October 25

- 1500 UTC (08:30 p.m. IST) – Cyclonic Storm Murjan makes landfall over Somalia coast at peak intensity and quickly weakens into a Depression.

October 26

- 0600 UTC (11:30 a.m. IST) – Depression Murjan dissipates into an area of low pressure.

October 28

- 0330 UTC (09:00 a.m. IST) – The JTWC issues a TCFA on a gradually developing area of low pressure with deep convection was building over a cloud-covered low level circulation center.
- 0900 UTC (02:30 p.m. IST) – Depression BOB 02 develops from the area of low pressure located some 550 km (340 mi) to the northeast of Trincomalee, Sri Lanka.

October 29

- 0000 UTC (05:30 a.m. IST) – Depression BOB 02 strengthens into a Deep Depression with deep convection surrounding the system.
- 1500 UTC (08:30 p.m. IST) – The JTWC stats monitoring BOB 02 as Tropical Cyclone 02B with windspeeds equivalent to a tropical storm on the Saffir–Simpson hurricane scale.

October 30

- 0300 UTC (08:30 a.m. IST) – Deep Depression BOB 02 strengthens into a Cyclonic Storm roughly 100 km (60 mi) to the northeast of Trincomalee in Sri Lanka.
- 2300 UTC (October 31–4:30 p.m. IST) – Cyclonic Storm Nilam makes landfall on the Indian Coast near Mahabalipuram and started gradually losing strength.

=== November ===
November 1

- 0300 UTC (08:30 a.m. IST) – Cyclonic Storm Nilam weakens into a Deep Depression after prolonged land-interaction.
- 0600 UTC (11:30 a.m. IST) – Deep Depression Nilam further weakens into a Depression over the Rayalaseema region of Andhra Pradesh.

November 2

- 0600 UTC (11:30 a.m. IST) – Depression Nilam dissipates into an area of low pressure over north interior Karnataka.

November 17

- 0900 UTC (02:30 p.m. IST) – Depression BOB 03 develops from an area of low pressure located some 750 kilometers east-southeast of Visakhapatnam.
- 1500 UTC (08:30 p.m. IST) – Depression BOB 03 intensifies into a Deep Depression.
- 2100 UTC (02:30 a.m. IST, on November 18) – The JTWC initiates advisories on Deep Depression BOB 03 reporting 1-minute sustained winds of 35 knots (65 km/h; 40 mph).

November 19

- 0000 UTC (05:30 a.m. IST) – Deep Depression BOB 03 weakens into a Depression following severe wind shear.
- 1800 UTC (11:30 p.m. IST) – Depression BOB 03 dissipates into a remnant low.

== See also ==
- 2012 North Indian Ocean cyclone season
- Cyclone Nilam
- Timeline of the 2012 Pacific hurricane season
- Timeline of the 2012 Atlantic hurricane season
