= MT Pratibha Cauvery =

MT Pratibha Cauvery was an oil tanker which ran aground near Chennai's Besant Nagar beach when Cyclone Nilam made landfall near Mahaballipuram. That same night the ship moved near Marina Beach. It was salvaged by towing vessel Malvya on 31 October 2012.

Six months after it ran aground, drowning six sailors, the oil tanker was sold for Rs. 16 crore. The Madras High Court, on 18 April 2013 ordered the sale of the ship through tender, rejecting the request for private sale. The ship belonged to the Minami Nippon Shipbuilding Co.Ltd. of Japan.
