= 2012 North Indian Ocean cyclone season =

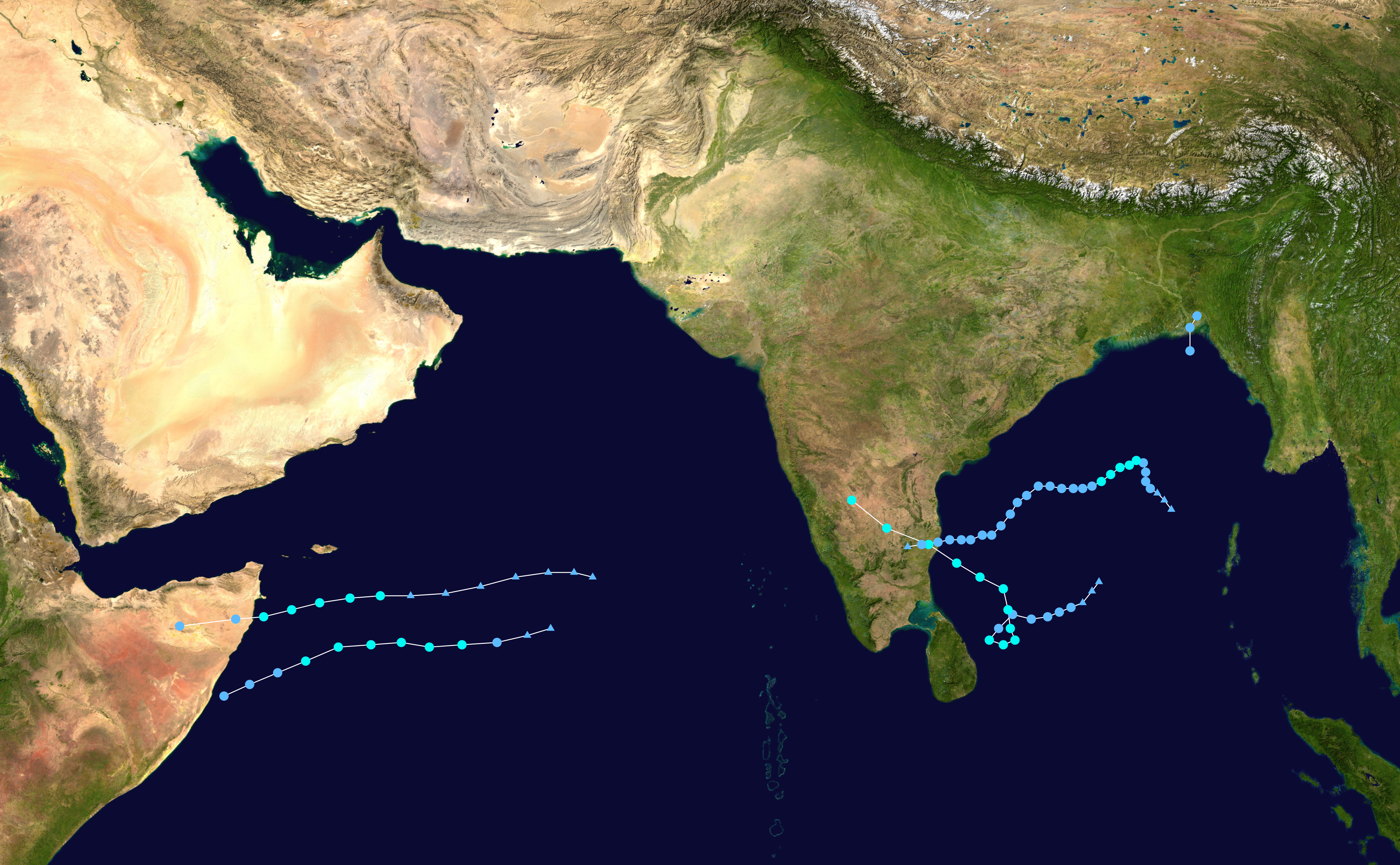
- Season summary map

Seasonal boundaries
- First system formed: October 10, 2012
- Last system dissipated: December 24, 2012

Strongest storm
- Name: Nilam
  - Maximum winds: 85 km/h (50 mph) (3-minute sustained)
  - Lowest pressure: 987 hPa (mbar)

Seasonal statistics
- Depressions: 5
- Deep depressions: 5
- Cyclonic storms: 2
- Severe cyclonic storms: 0 (record low, tied with 2005)
- Total fatalities: 128 total
- Total damage: $56.7 million (2012 USD)

Related articles
- Timeline of the 2012 North Indian Ocean cyclone season; 2012 Atlantic hurricane season; 2012 Pacific hurricane season; 2012 Pacific typhoon season

The 2012 North Indian Ocean cyclone season was the second least active season on record, only behind 1993. The season had a very late start, with the first system forming in October. During the season, only five systems formed, of which only two became cyclonic storms. Both the storms made landfall, and they, along with the deep depressions, were responsible for 128 deaths and economic losses worth at least $56.7 million (2012 USD).

The scope of this article is limited to the Indian Ocean in the Northern Hemisphere, east of the Horn of Africa and west of the Malay Peninsula. There are two main seas in the North Indian Ocean — the Arabian Sea to the west of the Indian subcontinent, abbreviated ARB by the India Meteorological Department (IMD); and the Bay of Bengal to the east, abbreviated BOB by the IMD. The official Regional Specialized Meteorological Centre in this basin is the India Meteorological Department (IMD), while the Joint Typhoon Warning Center releases unofficial advisories.

== Season summary ==
The first depression of the season developed out of the remnants of Severe Tropical Storm Gaemi on October 10, 2012, very late into the 2012 cyclone season, about 350 km (215 mi) southeast of Kolkata, West Bengal. and brought high winds and heavy rains to much of Bangladesh, causing extensive damage. The storm killed a total of 30 people. On October 23, the second depression of the season developed out of a persistent low in the Arabian Sea and soon became the first cyclonic storm of the season Murjan. Only two days later, the third depression of the season formed in southern Bay of Bengal and gradually strengthened into Cyclonic Storm Nilam. The cyclone made landfall over Southern India early on October 31 and dissipated on November 2.

== Systems ==
=== Deep Depression BOB 01 ===
- Deep depression (IMD)
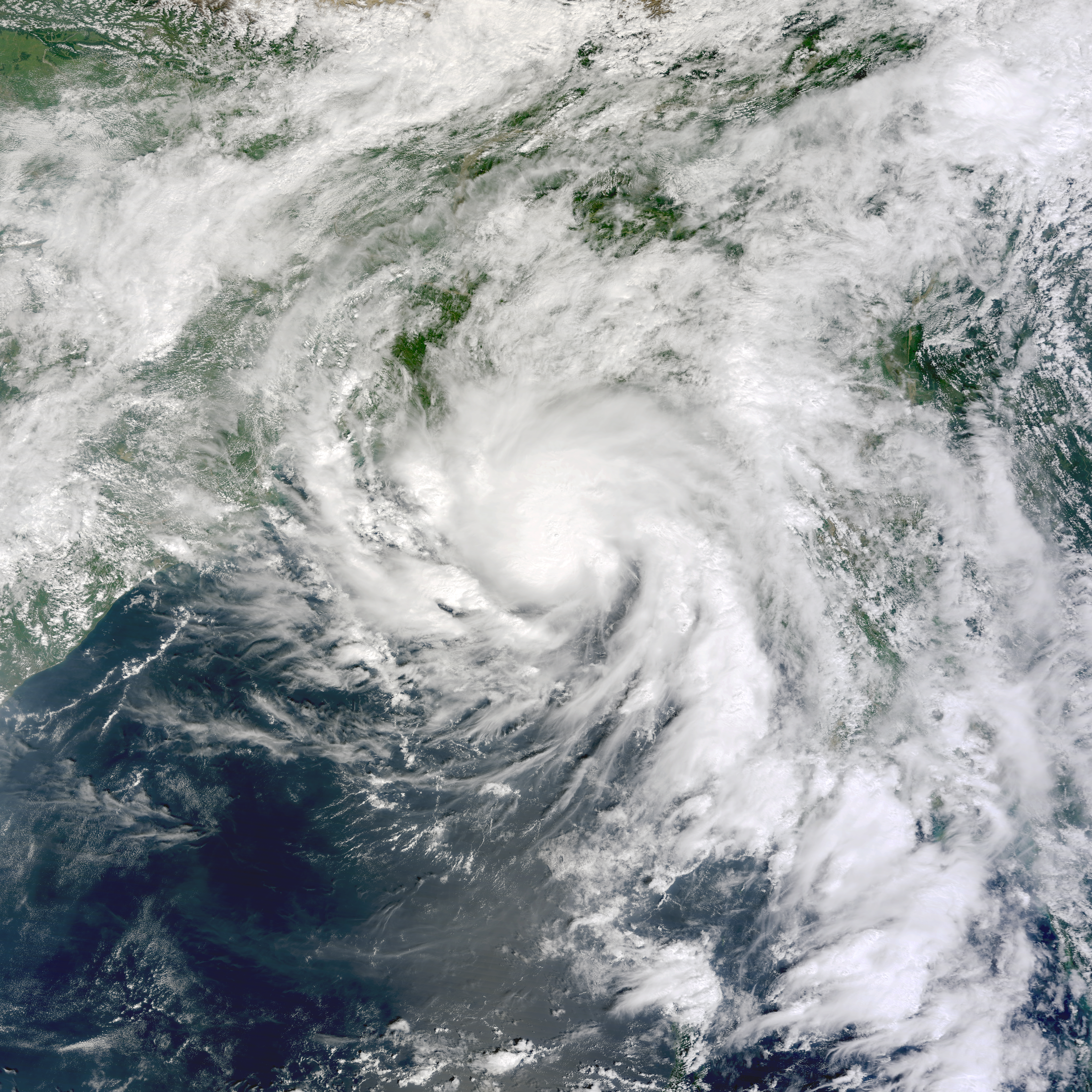
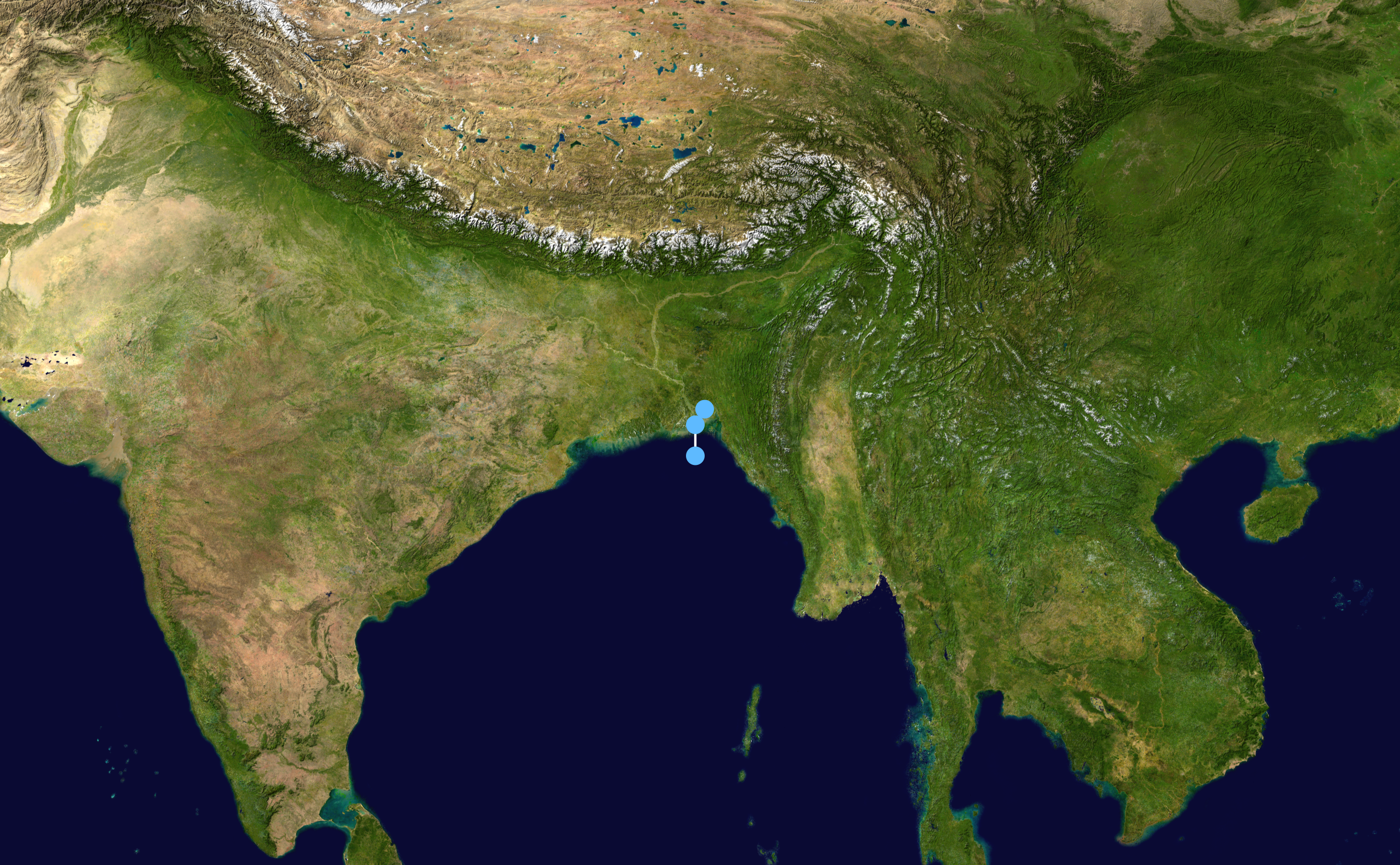
- Duration: October 10 – October 11
- Peak intensity: 55 km/h (35 mph) (3-min); 1000 hPa (mbar)

On October 10, the IMD started to monitor a depression that had developed out of an area of convection, associated with the remnants of Severe Tropical Storm Gaemi about 350 km (215 mi) southeast of Kolkata, West Bengal. During that day the depression moved towards the north and crossed the Bangladesh coast near Hatiya early the next day. After the depression had made landfall, the IMD issued their final advisory on the depression as the system had weakened into an area of low pressure.

The storm brought high winds and heavy rains to much of Bangladesh, causing extensive damage. At least 1,500 mud, straw, and tin houses were destroyed and 30,000 more were damaged. Across the country, at least 43 people were killed. Additionally, a total of 106,585 people were affected. The most significant damage took place in Hatiya where seven people were killed and 1,000 homes were destroyed. Offshore, thousands of fishermen were caught off-guard by the storm and an estimated 1,500 were initially unaccounted for. However, this number was quickly reduced to around 60 the following day. According to the police chief of Bhola District, the storm was far stronger than forecast and no warnings for a major storm were made. In light of the damage wrought by the storm, Oxfam called for international aid to the country.

=== Cyclonic Storm Murjan ===
- Cyclonic storm (IMD)
- Tropical storm (SSHWS)
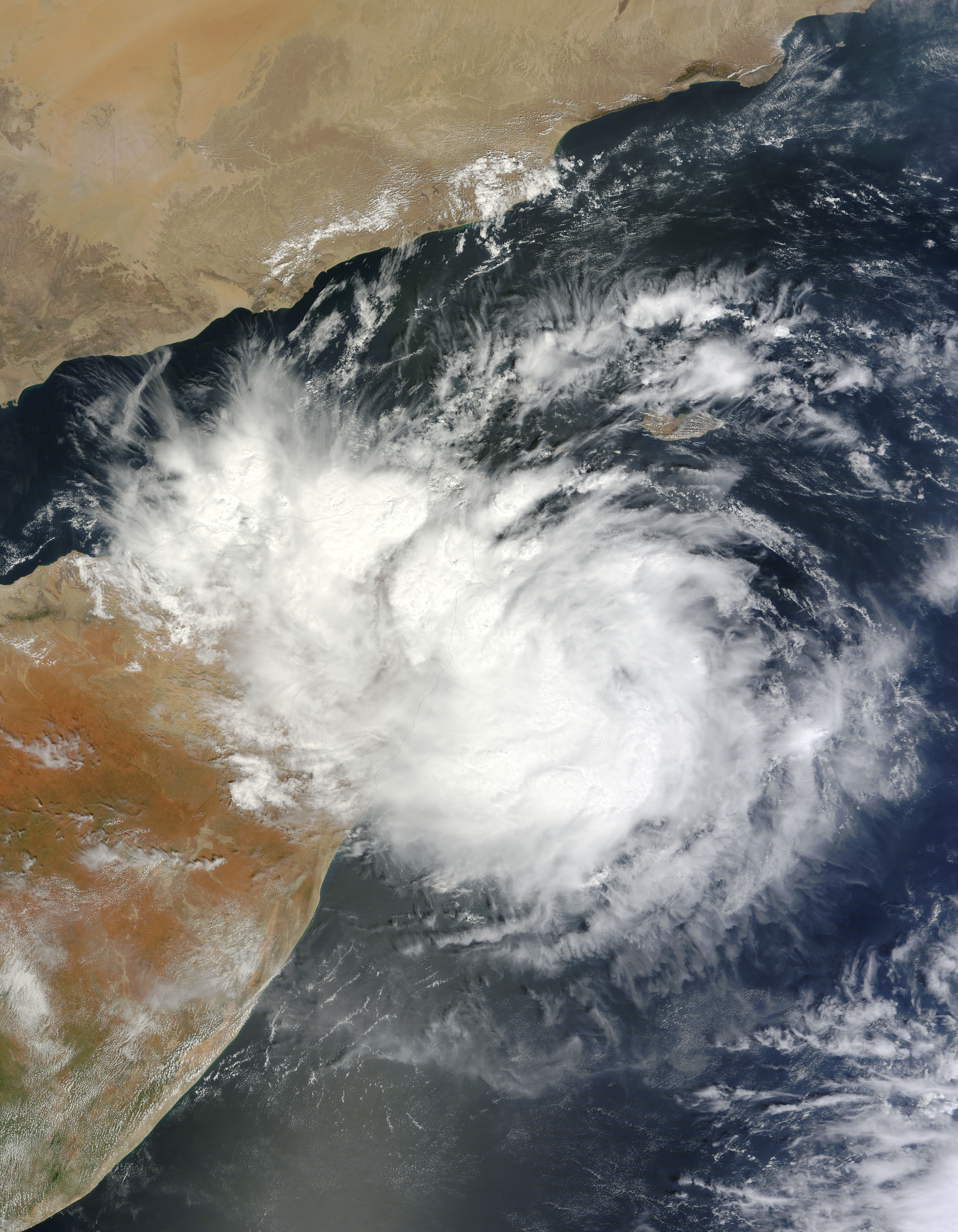
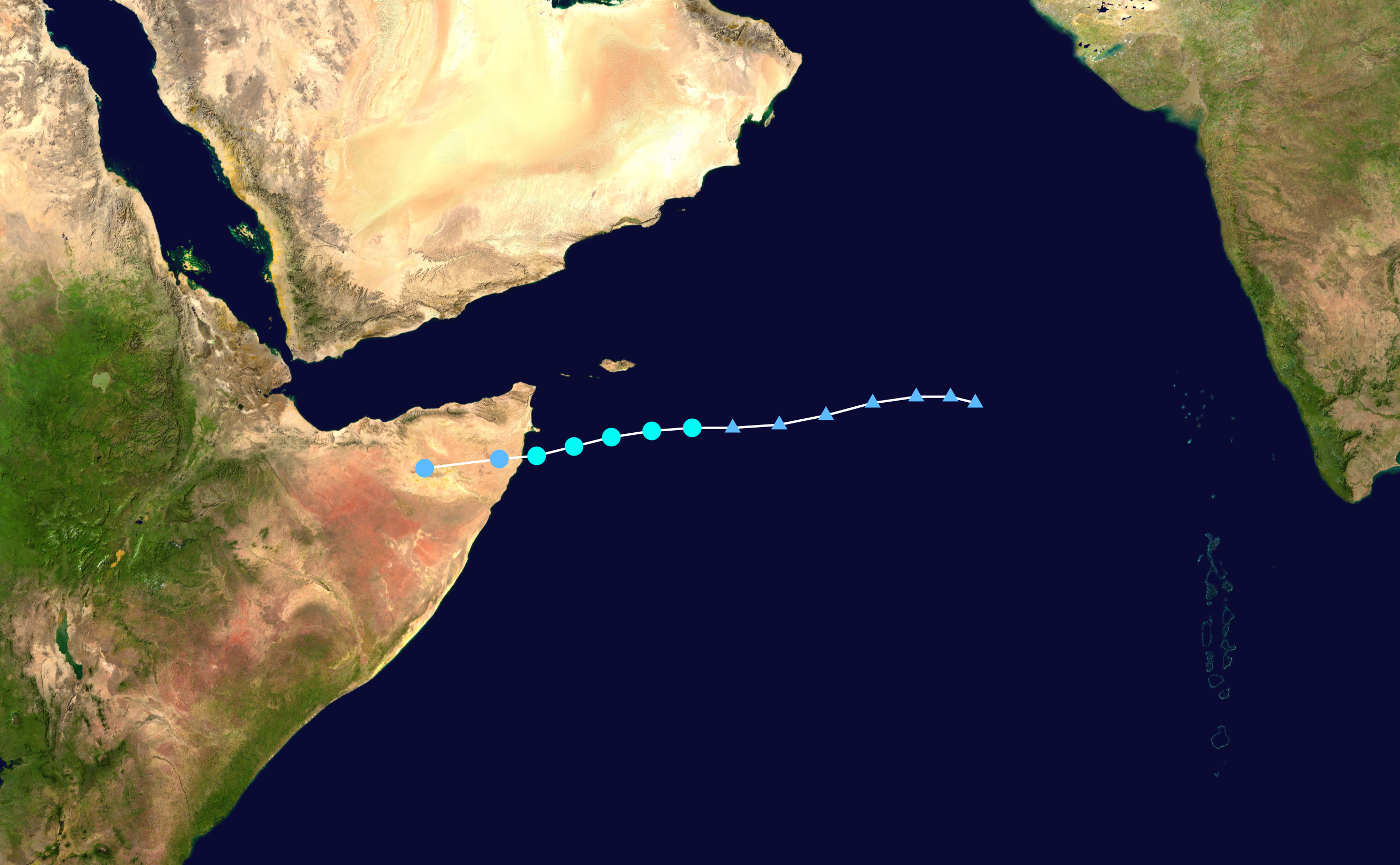
- Duration: October 22 – October 26
- Peak intensity: 75 km/h (45 mph) (3-min); 998 hPa (mbar)

On October 23, the IMD reported that a depression had developed out of an area of low pressure about 800 km (495 mi) to the west of India's Amindivi Islands. The storm then tracked westwards and intensified into a deep depression by 18:00 UTC on the same day, followed by a Tropical Cyclone Formation Alert issued by the Joint Typhoon Warning Center at 20:00 UTC. Late on October 24, the IMD upgraded depression ARB 01 to a cyclonic storm, officially naming it Murjan. (Note: The name Murjan (Arabic: مرجان, [murd͡ʒaːn]) was contributed by Oman and means "coral" or "small pearls" in Arabic.) Murjan became the first cyclonic storm of the season. The cyclone continued tracking westward at 14 knots (26 km/h; 16 mph). Microwave satellite imagery depicted that most of the convection remained to the south of the system. At that time, Murjan was tracking just south of a subtropical ridge in an environment with low vertical wind shear. The storm crossed the coast of Somalia by late 25 October and gradually weakened into a depression. The India Meteorological Department issued their final bulletin for Murjan at 06:00 UTC of 26 October 2012.

There were reports of severe flooding in Bosaso city in Somalia. The storm brought strong winds and heavy but beneficial rains within the areas of Bari region (Bossasso, Ishkushban and Bandar Beyla) according to the Somalia Water and Land Information Management.

=== Cyclonic Storm Nilam ===
- Cyclonic storm (IMD)
- Tropical storm (SSHWS)
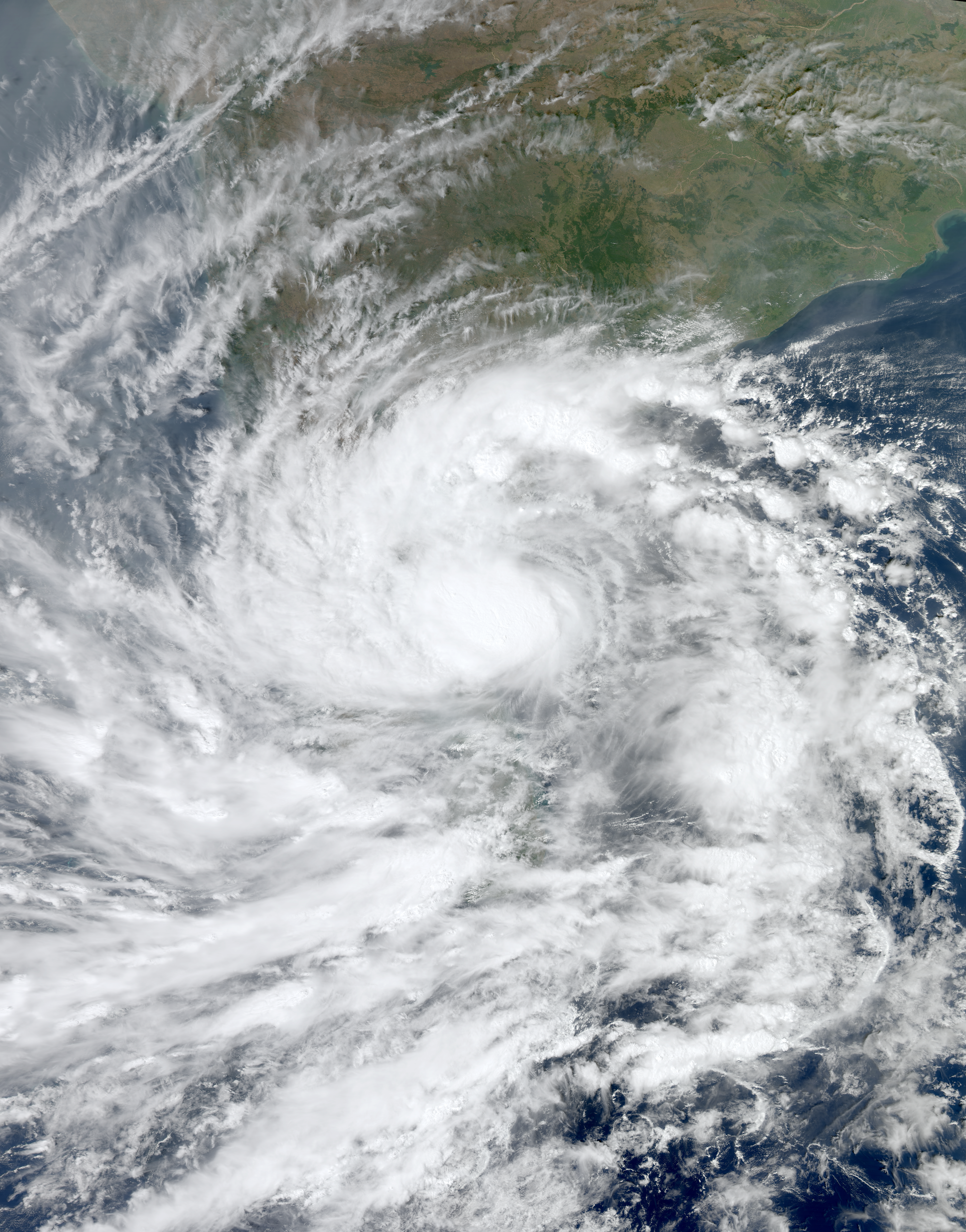
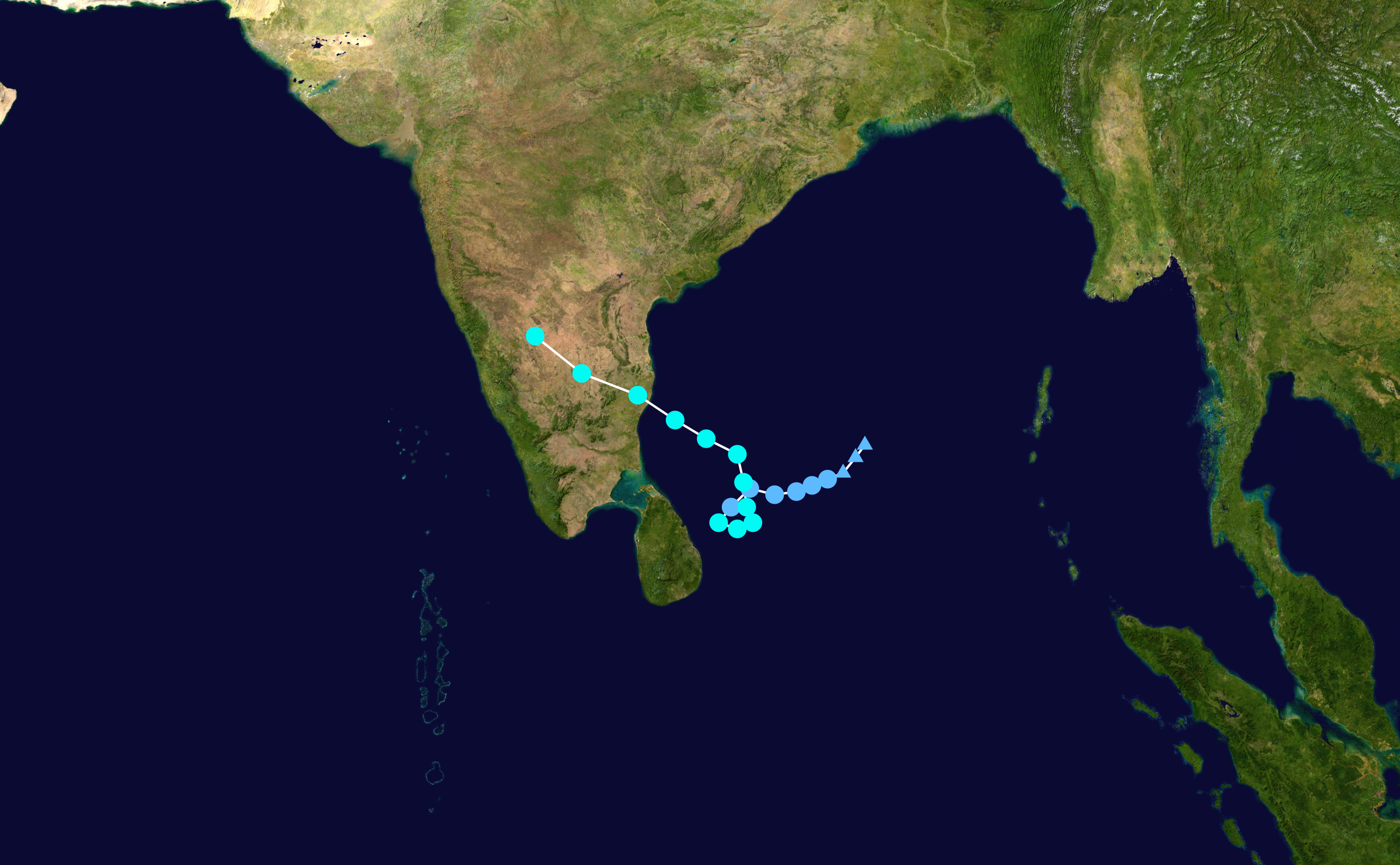
- Duration: October 28 – November 1
- Peak intensity: 85 km/h (50 mph) (3-min); 987 hPa (mbar)

An area of convection crossed the Isthmus of Kra on 23 October and entered the Bay of Bengal from the Pacific Ocean. It slowly organized itself and the Joint Typhoon Warning Center (JTWC) issued a TCFA at 03:30 UTC of 28 October. The India Meteorological Department (IMD) later upgraded the low-pressure area to a Depression on the same day, when the storm was located about 550 km (340 mi) east-northeast of Trincomalee, Sri Lanka. Early on 29 October, BOB 02 was upgraded to a Deep Depression and was put under constant surveillance by the IMD. Later that day, the JTWC initiated advisories on the system, designating it with 02B. The next day, BOB 02 further intensified into a cyclonic storm and was named Nilam by the IMD. (Note: The name Nilam (Urdu: نیلم, [niːləm]) was contributed by Pakistan and means "sapphire" in Urdu.) The storm made landfall at peak intensity near Mahabalipuram on 31 October, and started weakening. Reporting that the storm reached a peak intensity of 55 knots (102 km/h; 63 mph) (1-min sustained winds), the JTWC issued their last advisory on the system. In the early hours of November 1, Nilam weakened into a Deep Depression. As it moved further inland into the Rayalaseema region of Andhra Pradesh, Nilam further weakened into a Depression. Nilam dissipated on November 2, over north interior Karnataka.

The storm brought torrential rains to Sri Lanka. The Puttalam – Mannar road was submerged under about a meter of water near Eluwankulama due to the overflowing of the Kala Oya river. According to the police, a 27-year-old woman was killed when a sand rock fell on her house during heavy rains at Habaraduwa in Galle District. Rail services were temporarily suspended when electricity lines fell on the railway track. In Chennai, all schools and colleges were closed as 282 schools and 52 community hallwereve been converted into cyclone shelters. Danger signal 7 was hosted in Chennai, Ennore, Cuddalore and Nagapattinam ports of Tamil Nadu and in Puducherry, and danger signal 3 in Krishnapatnam, Vadarevu, Machilipatnam and Nizampatnam ports of Andhra Pradesh.

=== Deep Depression BOB 03 ===
- Deep depression (IMD)
- Tropical storm (SSHWS)
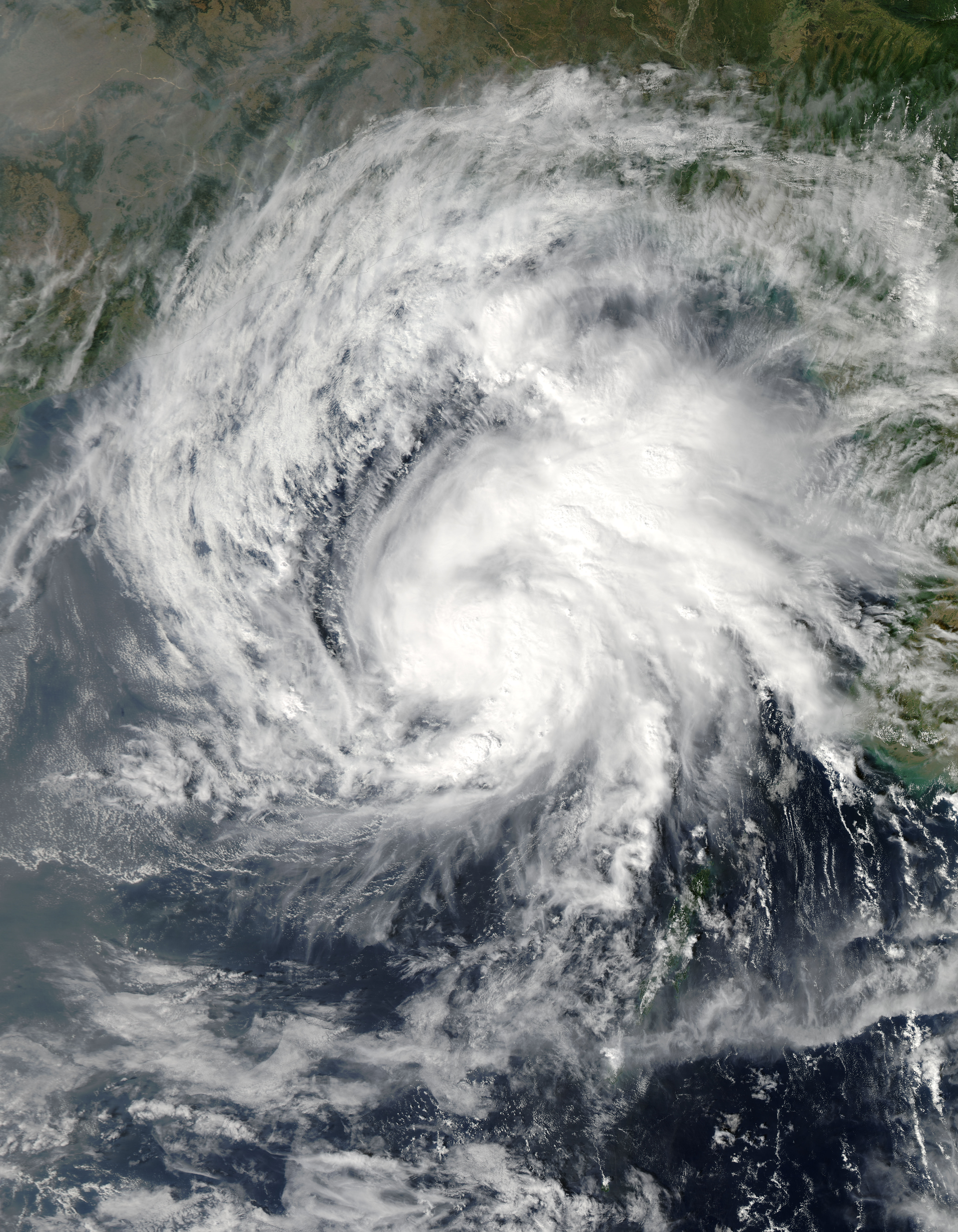
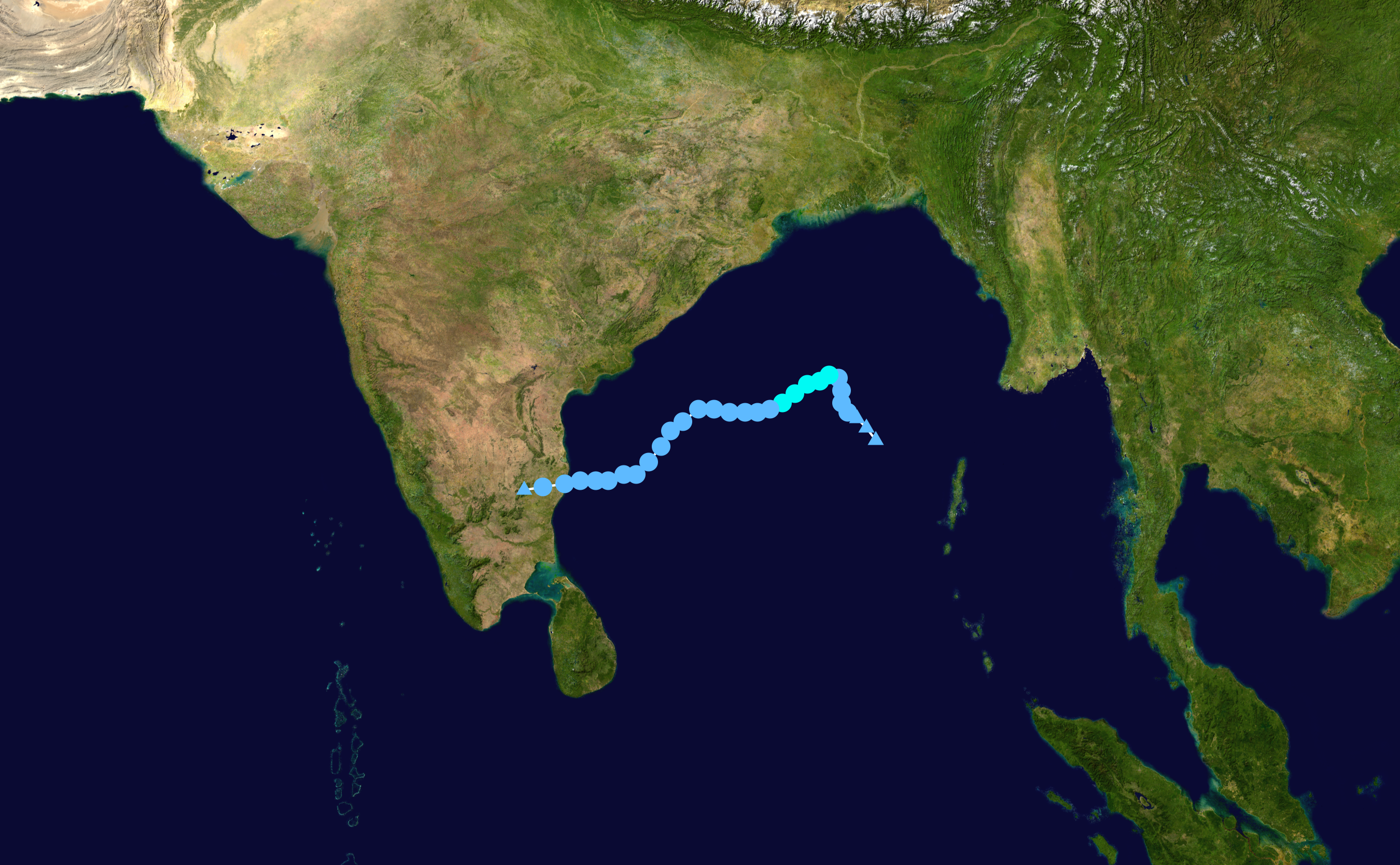
- Duration: November 17 – November 19
- Peak intensity: 55 km/h (35 mph) (3-min); 1002 hPa (mbar)

An area of low pressure formed in the Bay of Bengal on 12 November. It gradually drifted northwestwards and organized itself until on November 17, when the JTWC issued a TCFA on the system, reporting 30 knot winds at the center. About half an hour following the TCFA, the IMD upgraded the area of low pressure into a Depression, and further into a Deep Depression, the same evening. BOB 03 developed a well-defined LLCC with increasing deep convection located to the north of the system. In an environment with weak to moderate vertical wind shear and high sea surface temperatures, the depression intensified further. The same night, the JTWC initiated advisories on the system, classifying it as a tropical storm with one minute sustained winds of 35 knots. On November 18, BOB 03 encountered strong wind shear from the south west that diminished most of its convection. Soon, the LLCC became fully exposed, as a result of the wind shear. Located just north of a subtropical ridge, BOB 03's inflow was affected by dry air that wrapped the center of the storm. The following day, IMD reported the storm had weakened into a depression and was predicted to weaken further. At the same time, JTWC stopped tracking BOB 03, stating that the storm's wind speeds had diminished to below warning criteria. By 1800 UTC of 19 November 2012, IMD reported the storm had weakened into a well marked low-pressure area and issued their last bulletin for the system. The system later had a few bursts of convection, before dissipating completely off the coast of southern India, on November 20. Tirupathi city recorded a heavy rainfall of 181mm which was the highest in that region.

=== Deep Depression ARB 02 ===
- Deep depression (IMD)
- Tropical storm (SSHWS)
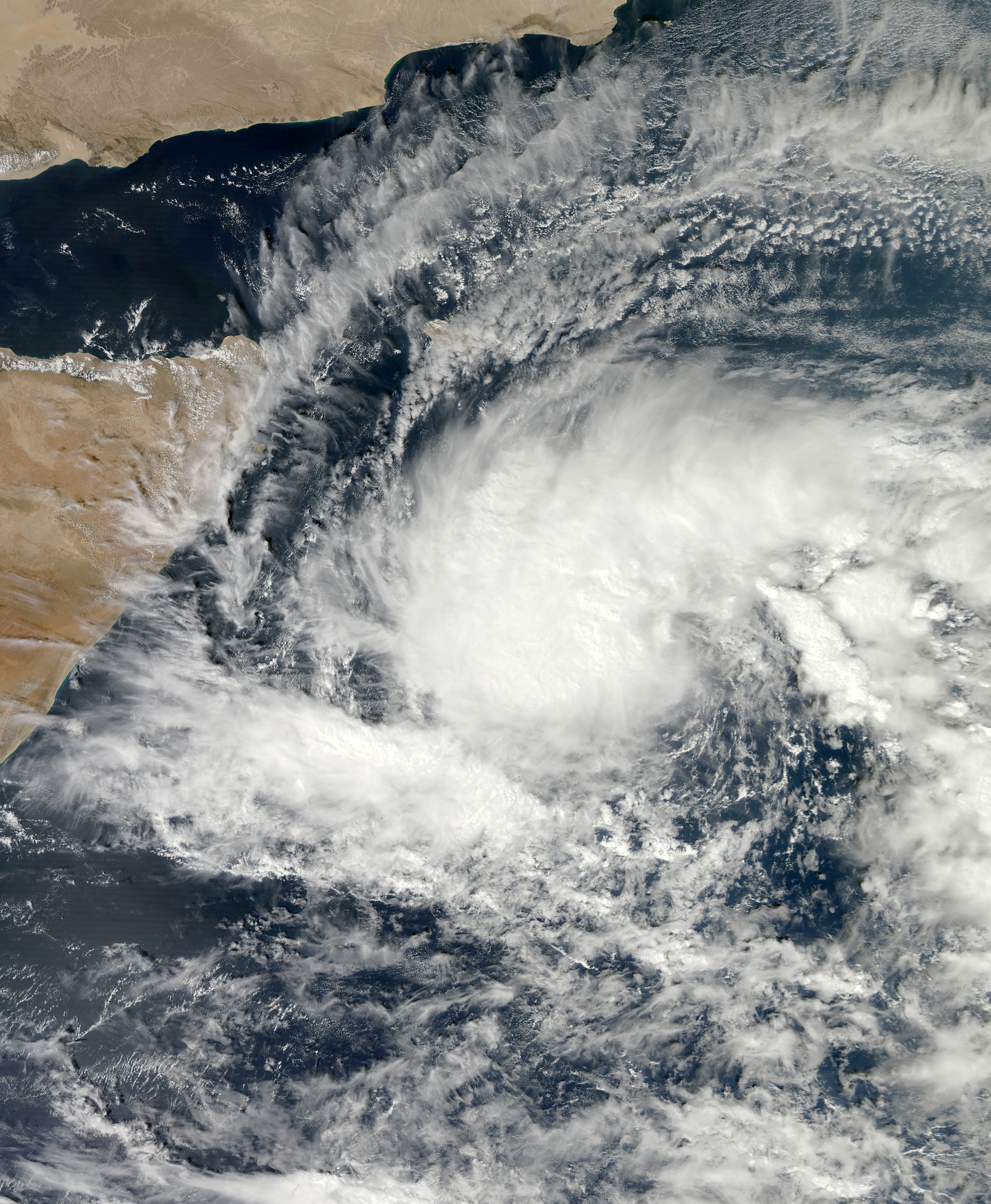
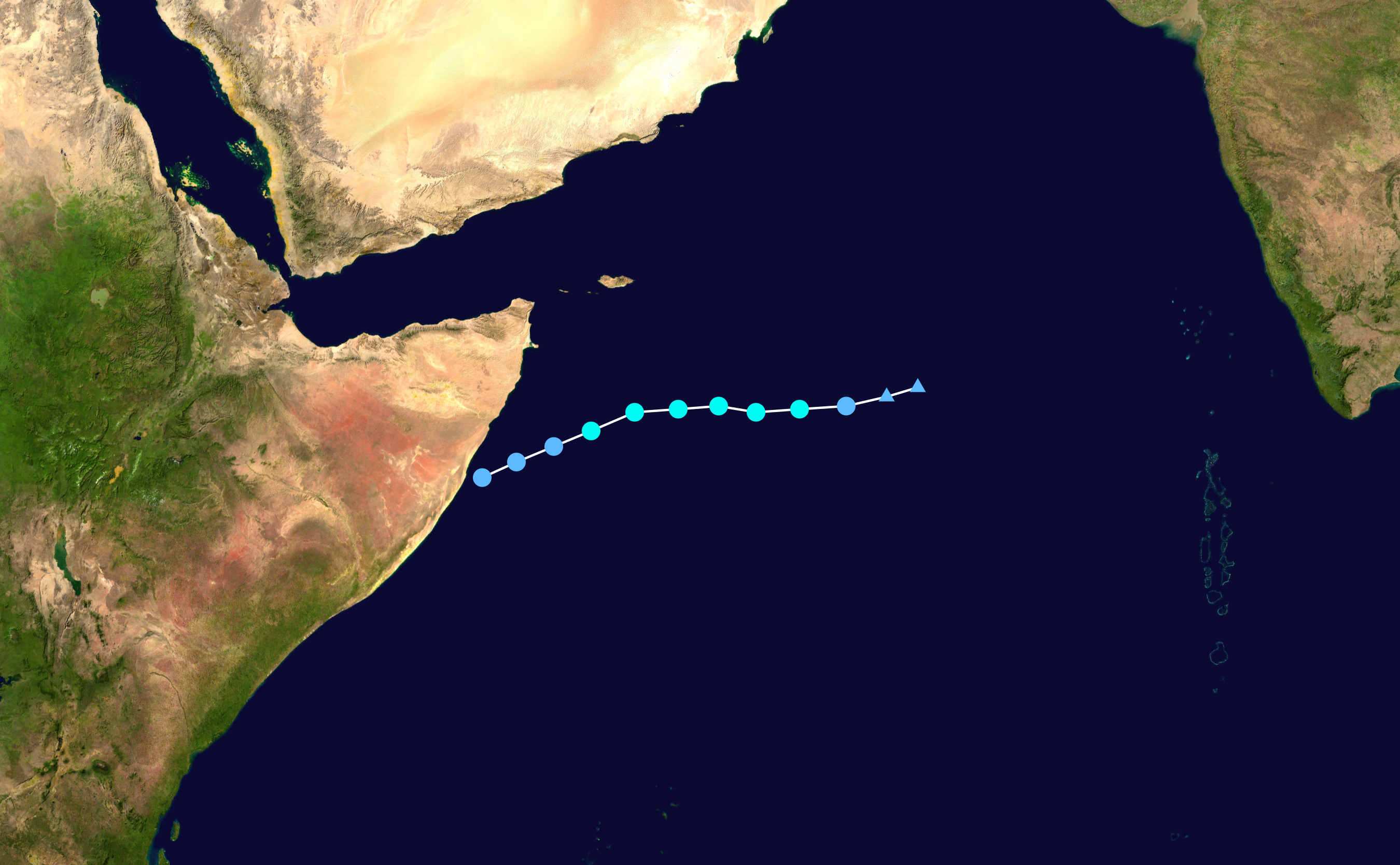
- Duration: December 22 – December 24
- Peak intensity: 55 km/h (35 mph) (3-min); 1002 hPa (mbar)

Under the influence of an active Inter-Tropical Convergence Zone, a low-pressure area formed over the Arabian Sea near 7.3°N and 70.7°E on 18 December. It slowly tracked westwards, organizing itself and intensifying into a Depression by 09:00 UTC of 22 December. The Joint Typhoon Warning Center (JTWC) upgraded the storm into a tropical cyclone by 03:00 UTC of 23 December, followed by Deep Depression status by the morning hours of the same day. However the storm encountered strong vertical wind shear and colder sea surface temperatures on 24 December, causing its low-level circulation center to become fully exposed, prompting JTWC to issue its final advisory on the storm. Further weakening ensued as land interaction increased, and the IMD downgraded ARB 02 into a low-pressure area on 25 December.

== Season effects ==
This is a table of all storms in the 2012 North Indian Ocean cyclone season. It mentions all of the season's storms and their names, durations, peak intensities (according to the IMD storm scale), damages, and death totals. Damage and death totals include the damage and deaths caused when that storm was a precursor wave or extratropical low, and all of the damage figures are in 2012 USD.

Name	Dates	Peak intensity			Areas affected	Damage (USD)	Deaths	Ref(s).
Name	Dates	Category	Wind speed	Pressure	Areas affected	Damage (USD)	Deaths	Ref(s).
BOB 01	October 10–11	Deep Depression	55 km/h (35 mph)	1,002 hPa (29.59 inHg)	Bangladesh	Minimal	43	
Murjan	October 22–26	Cyclonic storm	75 km/h (45 mph)	998 hPa (29.47 inHg)	Yemen, Somalia	Minimal	None	
Nilam	October 28 – November 1	Cyclonic storm	85 km/h (55 mph)	987 hPa (29.15 inHg)	Sri Lanka, India	56.7 million	75	
BOB 03	November 17–19	Deep Depression	55 km/h (35 mph)	1,002 hPa (29.59 inHg)	India	None	None	
ARB 02	December 22–24	Deep Depression	55 km/h (35 mph)	1,002 hPa (29.59 inHg)	Somalia	Unknown	None	
Season aggregates
5 systems	October 10 – December 25		85 km/h (55 mph)	990 hPa (29.23 inHg)		56.7 million	128	

== See also ==
- Tropical cyclones in 2012
- 2012 Pacific hurricane season
- 2012 Atlantic hurricane season
- 2012 Pacific typhoon season
- South-West Indian Ocean cyclone seasons: 2011–12, 2012–13
- Australian region cyclone seasons: 2011–12, 2012–13
- South Pacific cyclone seasons: 2011–12, 2012–13
