= Cyclone Nilam =

North Indian cyclone in 2012

Cyclonic Storm Nilam
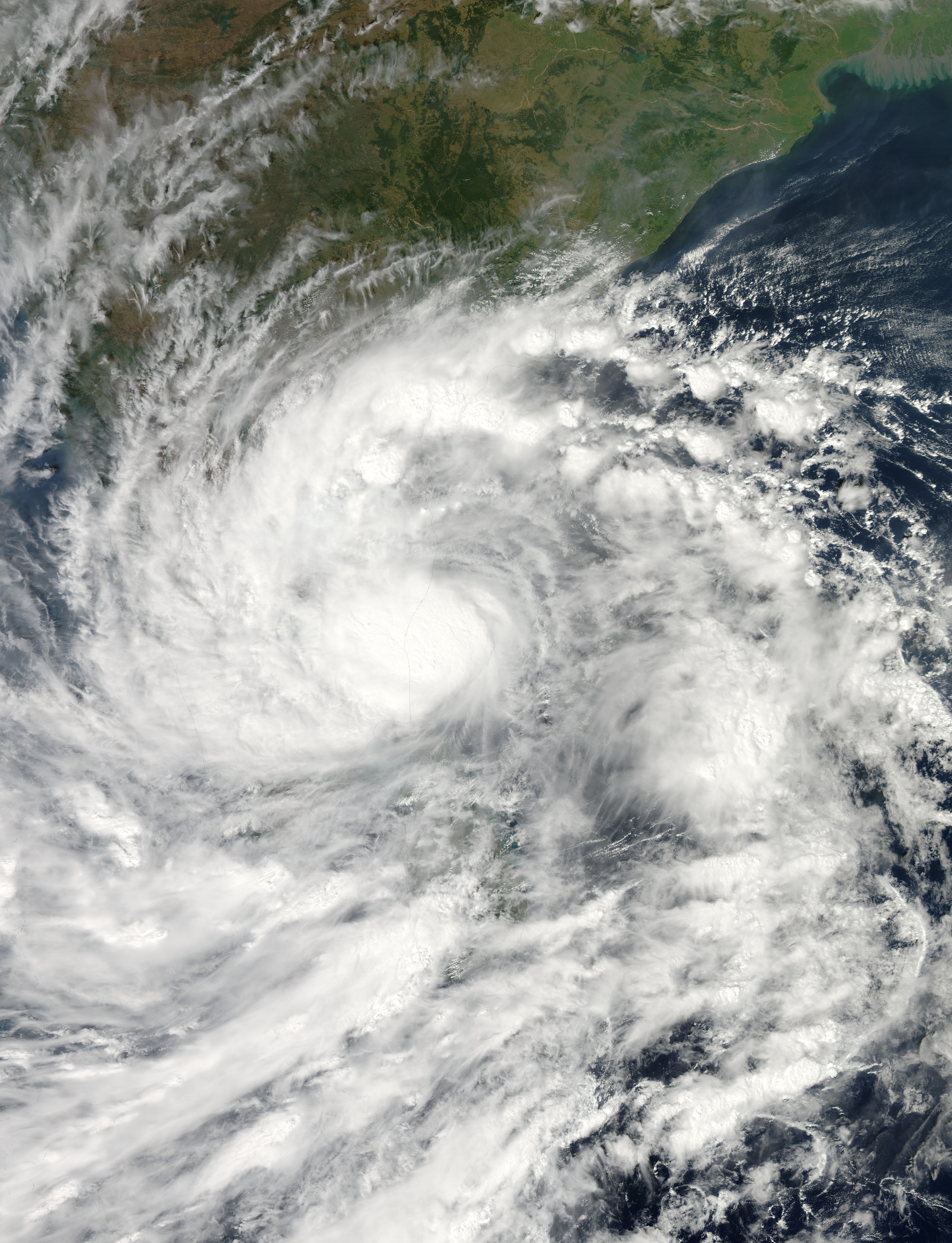
- Cyclonic Storm Nilam at landfall near peak intensity on 31 October 2012

Meteorological history
- Formed: 28 October 2012
- Dissipated: 1 November 2012

Cyclonic storm
- 3-minute sustained (IMD)
- Highest winds: 85 km/h (50 mph)
- Lowest pressure: 987 hPa (mbar); 29.15 inHg

Tropical storm
- 1-minute sustained (SSHWS/JTWC)
- Highest winds: 95 km/h (60 mph)
- Lowest pressure: 985 hPa (mbar); 29.09 inHg

Overall effects
- Fatalities: 75 total
- Damage: ≥$56.7 million (2012 USD)
- Areas affected: Sri Lanka, South India
- IBTrACS
- Part of the 2012 North Indian Ocean cyclone season

Cyclonic Storm Nilam (Note: The name Nilam (Urdu: نیلم, [niːləm]) was contributed by Pakistan and means "sapphire" in Urdu.) was a weak, but deadly tropical cyclone that became the deadliest tropical cyclone to directly affect South India since Cyclone Jal in 2010. The second named Cyclonic Storm of the rather quiet 2012 North Indian Ocean cyclone season, Nilam originated from an area of low pressure over the Bay of Bengal on 28 October 2012. The system began as a weak depression 550 km (340 mi) northeast of Trincomalee, Sri Lanka. Over the following few days, the depression gradually intensified into a deep depression, and subsequently a cyclonic storm by 30 October. It made landfall near Mahabalipuram on 31 October as a strong cyclonic storm with peak winds of 85 km/h (55 mph). In Chennai's Marina Beach, strong winds pushed piles of sand ashore and seawater reached nearly a 100 m (330 ft) inland. Schools and colleges in the city remained closed for more than three days.

More than 3000 people were evacuated around Mahabalipuram in the wake of the storm. Schools and colleges in Chennai declared holidays until 1 November as 282 schools had been converted into relief centers. Government offices and private organizations closed their operations by 3 p.m. to ease traffic congestion. Cyclone shelters had been arranged in Nagapattinam and Cuddalore districts. Mahabalipuram and chennai faced power outages and 90 trees were uprooted and two huts were damaged. While damages to property were considerable, human casualties were very few. Nilam was initially estimated to have caused economic losses of around ₹700 million (US$7.3 million) to ₹800 million (US$8.3 million). The figures soon went up to ₹100 crore (US$10 million). Later, as the Andhra Pradesh government conducted their review on the storm, it was revealed that the state suffered huge economic losses of ₹200 crore (US$21 million).

In Bangalore, heavy rains and strong winds felled over 86 trees. One fell on the compound wall of a police commissioner's residence, causing structural damage. In Basava Road, a tree pulled down power lines, along with six electric poles outing power in the locality. Over 3,000 tonnes of debris was cleared out using 285 trucks. 87.5 millimetres (3.44 in) of rainfall was recorded in the city with a maximum sustained windspeed of 47 km/h (29 mph).

== Meteorological history ==
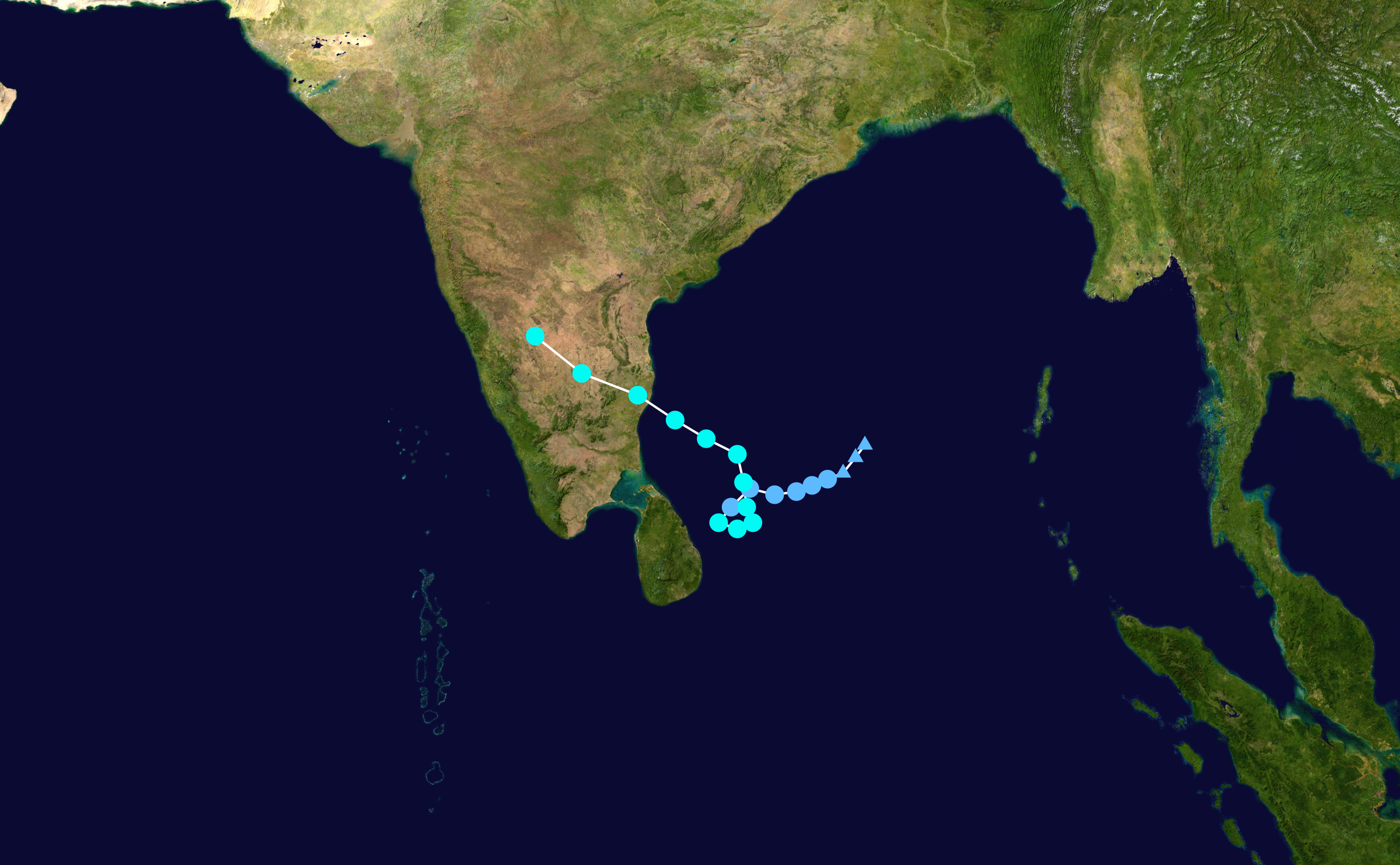
Map plotting the storm's track and intensity, according to the Saffir–Simpson scale Map key Saffir–Simpson scale Tropical depression (≤38 mph, ≤62 km/h) Tropical storm (39–73 mph, 63–118 km/h) Category 1 (74–95 mph, 119–153 km/h) Category 2 (96–110 mph, 154–177 km/h) Category 3 (111–129 mph, 178–208 km/h) Category 4 (130–156 mph, 209–251 km/h) Category 5 (≥157 mph, ≥252 km/h) Unknown Storm type Tropical cyclone Subtropical cyclone Extratropical cyclone, remnant low, tropical disturbance, or monsoon depression

In the early hours of 27 October, the India Meteorological Department's Regional Specialized Meteorological Centre in New Delhi started to monitor an area of low pressure, that had developed in south central Bay of Bengal. The next day, the system intensified into a Depression about 550 km (340 mi) to the northeast of Trincomalee, Sri Lanka. The IMD officially designated it with BOB 02. During that day the depression moved towards the west and gradually developed further with deep convection surrounding the system becoming better organized. The Joint Typhoon Warning Centre also noted that deep convection was building over a cloud-covered low level circulation center and issued a Tropical Cyclone Formation Alert. Early the next day, RSMC New Delhi reported that the depression had intensified into a deep depression, before later that day the JTWC started to monitor the system as Tropical Cyclone 02B with windspeeds equivalent to a tropical storm.

Nilam continued to track northwestward under the influence of a low to mid-level subtropical ridge. In the early hours of 1 November, Nilam weakened into a deep depression. As it moved further inland into the Rayalaseema region of Andhra Pradesh, Nilam further weakened into a Depression. The IMD continued tracking Nilam as a weak depression until 2 November, when they issued their last warning on the system.

== Preparations and impact ==
Total deaths and Damage
Region	Deaths	Damage (in millions)	Source
Sri Lanka	10	Minimal	
Tamil Nadu	21	18.9	
Andhra Pradesh	44	37.8	
Total	75	56.7	

=== India ===
==== Andhra Pradesh ====
During the storm, 150,000 people were shifted to cyclone shelters in Nellore district. Along with Nellore, Chittoor district also saw very heavy rainfall. Severe flooding in Prakasam district blocked a highway and strong winds overturned a major truck. Several villages and towns in southern coastal Andhra Pradesh were flooded and heavy rains were also reported in Visakhapatnam, a major city in north Coastal Andhra. About 140 fishermen who all headed off a week ago, were reported to have been stranded off the Nellore coast. They were later on able to establish contact with their families and the Coast Guard successfully tried to rescue them. 3 were reportedly killed in Andhra Pradesh. On 1 November, more than 200 boats ran aground due to strong winds. TV9, a Telugu news channel reported that people in Nellore district continued to suffer from the effects of the storm even after landfall, due to lack of information regarding the cyclone.

As Nilam weakened, heavy rainfall continued affecting south coastal Andhra Pradesh, Rayalaseema and Telangana with heavy rains and flash flooding. The Kandaleru-Poondi part of the Telugu Ganga project near Gudur, reportedly overflowed cutting transportation across the river. Several villages in and around Ongole were inundated by floodwater. Several poor in coastal villagers who depended only on fishing had lost access to food and clean drinking water as fishing was prohibited for over three days. TV9 reported that over 12,000 poor had remained hungry over the past three days and no government official had visited the storm affected villages despite the prolonged shortage of food and lack of electricity. Severe flooding had blocked transportation between Ongole and the villages, stranding the villagers.

Four more people were found dead in Andhra Pradesh, as two people were electrocuted near the New Port railway station in Kakinada. Another old woman was killed by hypothermia while a man was found dead under the debris of a broken wall. The death toll in the state went up to seven. Rains in Andhra Pradesh inundated 76,980 hectares of cropland, most of which was paddy. As per reports, 449 electric poles were felled and 30 houses were damaged, out of which 16 houses were totally destroyed. In Hyderabad, heavy downpours from the cyclone's rainbands caused a six degree temperature drop. Trees were reportedly uprooted in the city's suburbs of SR Nagar, Shantinagar and Jaya Gardens near Malakpet.

==== Tamil Nadu ====
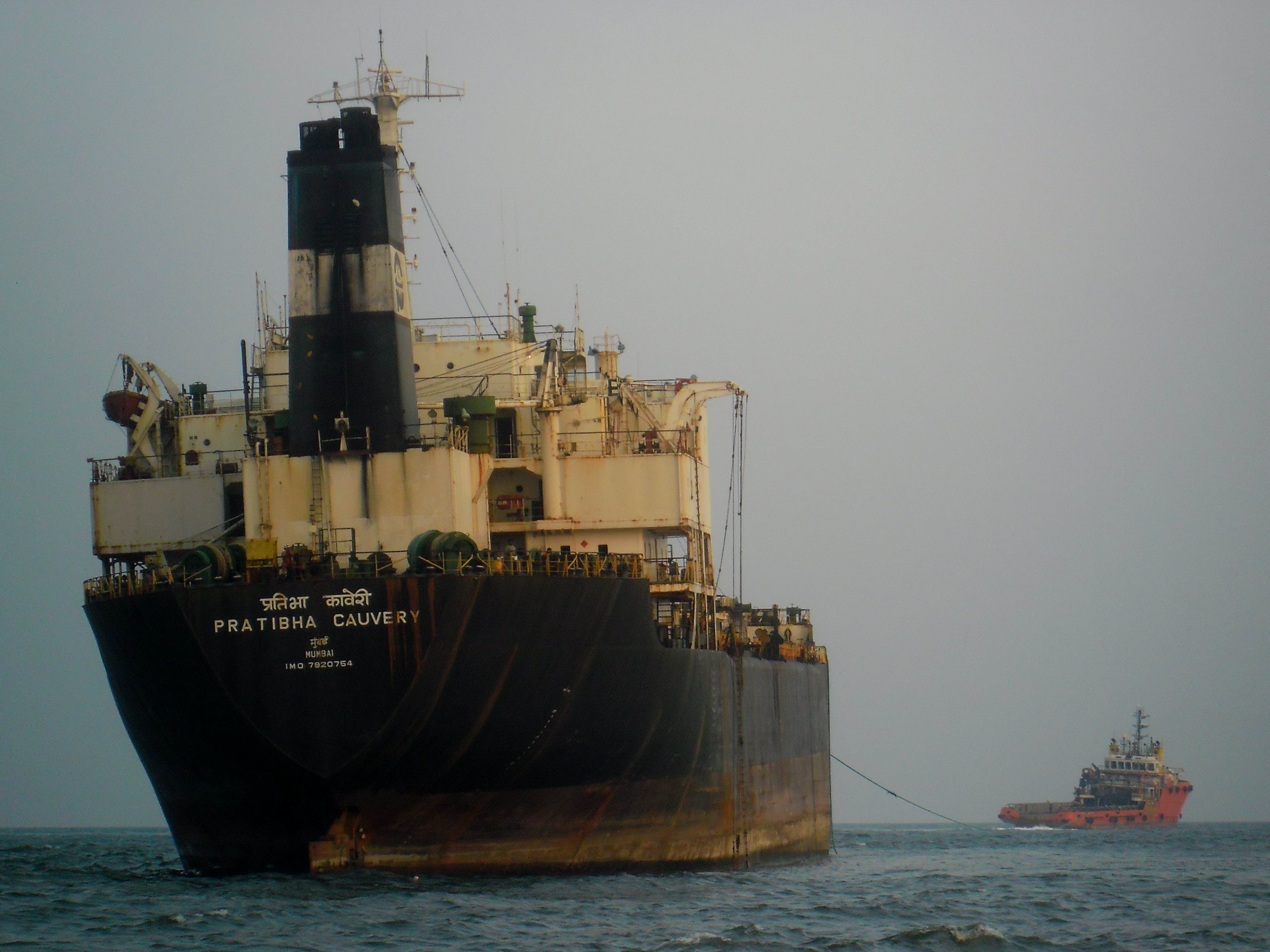
MT Pratibha Cauvery which ran aground near Marina beach was towed by Malavya towing ship from Mumbai.

The Chennai Port sounded a 'Danger 7' alarm and had sent off ships to outer sea to minimize damage when the storm made landfall. Madras Atomic Power Station, Kalpakkam officials stated that vigil was being maintained on all important equipment, and the reactors are made to withstand winds up to 160 km/h (99 mph). The oil tanker MT Pratibha Cauvery ran aground near Chennai after drifting into the storm. One crew member was reported to be killed, with 5 others missing. 16 crew members had reportedly escaped. The state government later declared a holiday for all schools and colleges of coastal districts. Over eight people were killed on the first day itself, as the storm made landfall on Tamil Nadu.

Floodwater totally inundated 51,486 hectares of directly sown farmland and 13,421 hectares of transplanted farmland; and partially submerged 4,404 hectares of directly sown area and 12,189 hectares of transplanted area. During the storm, 3,150 people were evacuated and kept in cyclone shelters at Thalainayar and Keezhaiyur. Among the evacuees, 2,100 people were from Pirinchamoolai, Vandal and Gundooranvellir villages and were taken to community halls. The rest of the people were taken to the Thalainayar Government Higher Secondary School in Thalainayar. Some 54 km (34 mi) of municipality roads and 23 km (14 mi) of town panchayat roads were damaged by the rains. In Chennai, weather returned to normal. Schools and colleges in the city, however, remained closed for 1 and 2 November. Residents gathered at the Santhome beach, observing the relief and rescue efforts made to help the victims of the MV Pratibha Cauvery. On 2 November, one of the MT Pratibha Cauvery's five missing sailors' bodies was found in the sea waters near Chennai. Four others remained missing even after a second day of search and rescue efforts which included four ships, two helicopters and two Dornier aircraft.

A few hours later, a second body was found at the estuary of Adyar River. Reports revealed that the ship's captain had ignored instructions to leave for safe waters following the cyclone alert. As efforts continued, another body was found afloat at sea. The Tamil Nadu death toll rose to 11, as a result. Though three bodies out of five were found, they were all yet to be identified. M. Jayaraman, a senior disaster management official, said that at least 16 people were killed in rainfall-related events. This figure, along with the deaths of the MV Pratibha Cauvery incident sent the Tamil Nadu death toll up to 19. On 3 November, the remaining two bodies from the MV Prathiba Cauvery incident were recovered, sending the death toll up to 21.

=== Sri Lanka ===
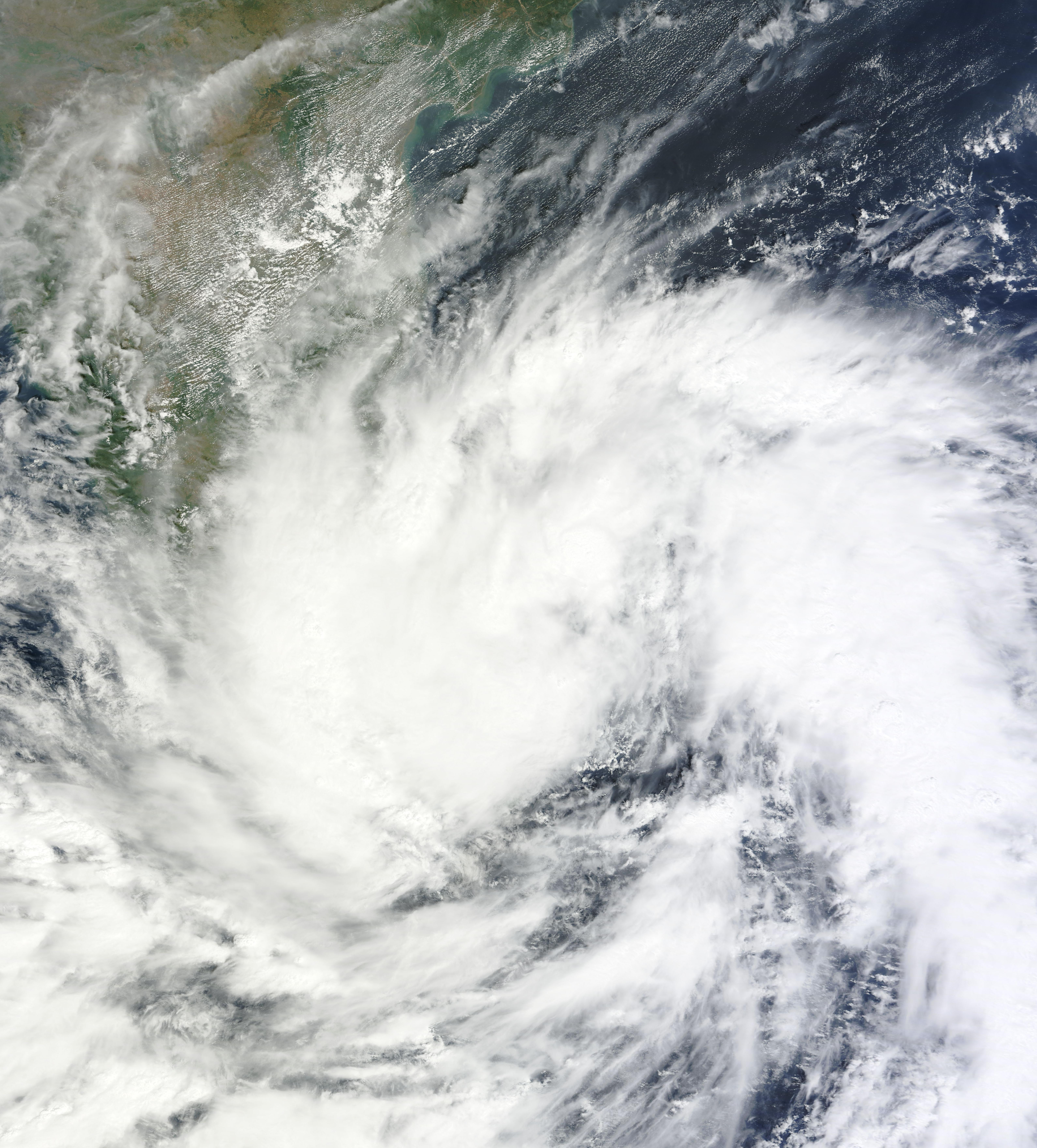
Nilam as a deep depression near Sri Lanka

Overall, 4,627 people were reportedly displaced due to the flooding and 56 people have left their homes in fear of landslides. Sri Lanka's Disaster Management Center said that about 1,000 houses were damaged by the storm. Across Sri Lanka, ten people were killed in events related to Cyclone Nilam.

== Aftermath ==
On 3 November, Sri Lanka's Disaster Management Centre reported that the process of relief and recovery had started. In Mullaitivu District, evacuees in the evacuation centers were returned to their houses. The flood in Kilinochchi had receded and the situation was normalized. In Jaffna District, divisional secretariats provided relief items and necessary amenities to the affected. In Nuwara Eliya District, families vulnerable to landslides were evacuated and sent to Vidulipura Temple. Meals and relief items were provided to the flood victims of Colombo and Gampaha districts.

=== Andhra Pradesh ===
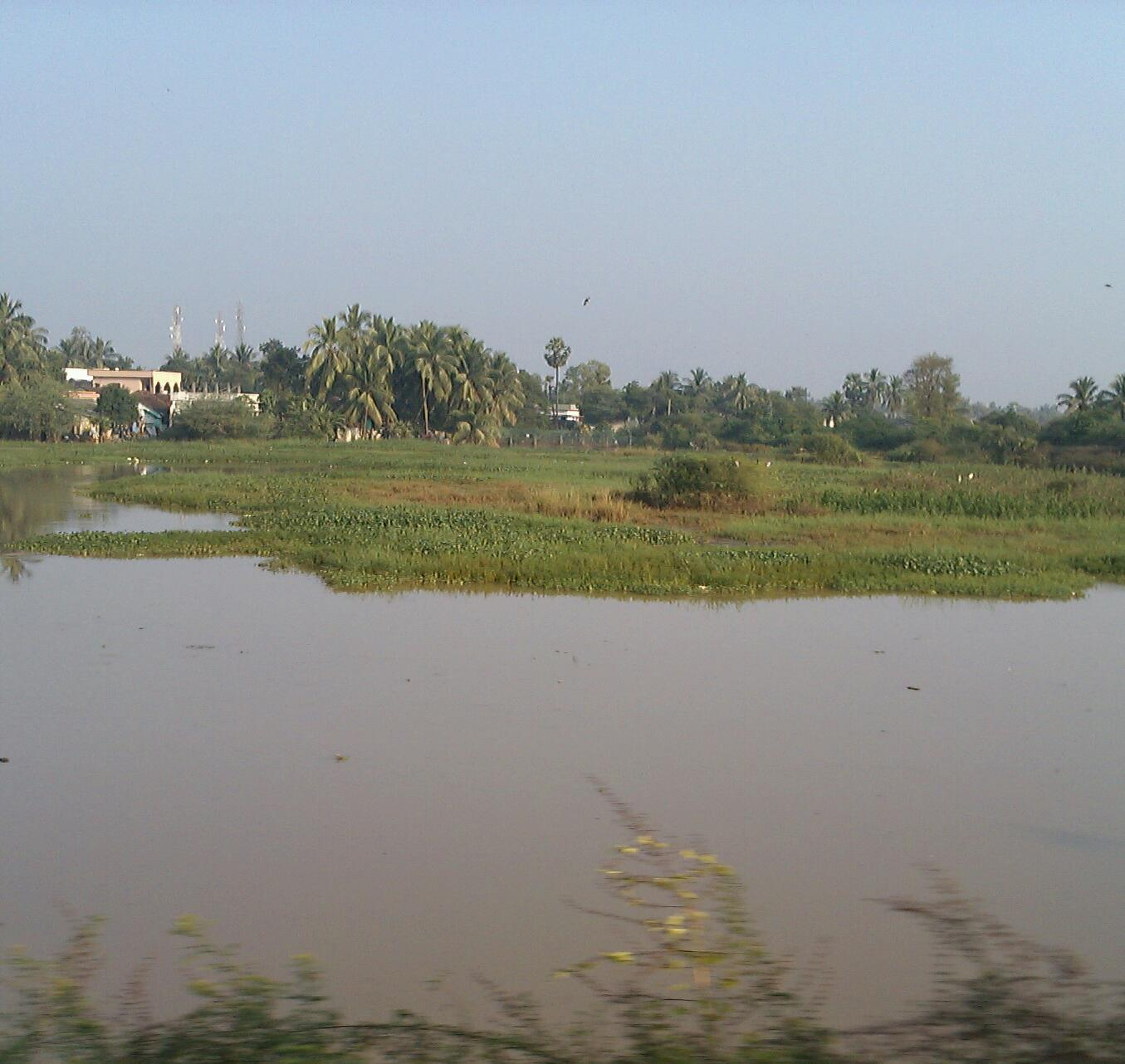
Floods in agricultural fields after Nilam hit Andhra Pradesh

In a review conducted by the Government of Andhra Pradesh, the next day, it was depicted that nearly 67,819 people of 21,655 families have been shifted to 86 relief camps across the state. Also, as per the report of Municipality of Andhra Pradesh, 495 km (308 mi) of roads, 406 km (252 mi) of drains, 107 km (66 mi) of water supply lines, 10,882 street lights and 36 municipal buildings were left in ruins, after the storm. As torrential rainfall damaged railway lines, several trains including Falaknuma Express, East Coast Express, and the Hyderabad–Visakhapatnam Godavari Express were either delayed or cancelled. Severe flooding in the state reportedly killed another 15 people, taking the death toll up to 22. Despite several hours passed since Nilam made landfall, the convection persisted and caused very heavy rainfall in north coastal Andhra Pradesh. Rains caused flash flooding and inundated five villages in Srikakulam district. To analyze the situation, Chief Minister Nallari Kiran Kumar Reddy conducted an aerial survey in flood affected areas. Also, heavy rains in Visakhapatnam district lead to a train derailment in Araku Valley, a famous tourist destination near Visakhapatnam. In East Godavari district, floodwater reportedly overflew a railway bridge. A temple in the district along with the city of Rajahmundry were inundated. TV9 supplied food and drinking water to the flood victims of the district. Following severe flooding in West Godavari district, four children were electrocuted on 6 November. The death toll rose to 28. Around 500,000 hectares of cropland was ruined while 68,000 people were evacuated and taken to flood relief camps. On 7 November, a government survey revealed economic losses of ₹200 crore (US$21 million). Exactly double the figure of Tamil Nadu, Andhra Pradesh suffered more economic damage and life loss though it was not directly hit. After another four-day long search and rescue, a total of 44 people were confirmed dead.

== See also ==
- Cyclone Thane
- 1990 Andhra Pradesh cyclone
