= Iggy (disambiguation) =

Iggy is a unisex given name or nickname. It may also refer to:

- Tropical Cyclone Iggy, in the 2011–12 Australian region cyclone season
- St. Ignatius College Prep, a Chicago, Illinois, secondary school occasionally referred to as "Iggy"
- Iggy's, a fine dining restaurant in Singapore
- Italian Greyhound, a breed of dog, often abbreviated as "I.G." or "Iggy"
- Iggy Koopa, one of the Koopalings
- Itsuki Takeuchi (Iggy in the Tokyopop version), a character in Initial D

== See also ==
- IGY (disambiguation)
