= Igi =

Igi or IGI may refer to:

== Organisations ==
- Industrial and General Insurance Company, based in Nigeria with subsidiaries in Uganda and Rwanda
- Innovative Genomics Institute, founded by Jennifer Doudna
- International Gemological Institute, a diamond grading laboratory
- University of International Golden Indonesia (Universitas IGI)

== Other uses ==
- Igi (short story), 1977, by Georgian author Jemal Karchkhadze
- Igi, one of the Asia Islands of Indonesia
- Igi, a Samoan slack-key guitar tuning
- IGI, or 𒅆, a cuneiform sign
- Indira Gandhi International Airport, Delhi
- Instrument Ground Instructor, a United States aviation license
- Interconnector Greece – Italy, a planned natural gas pipeline
- International Genealogical Index
- Project I.G.I., a tactical shooter computer game
  - I.G.I.-2: Covert Strike, its sequel

== See also ==
- Iggy
- IGY (disambiguation)
