= IGY =

IGY may refer to:

- Immunoglobulin Y (IgY), a type of antibody found in birds but not mammals
- International Geophysical Year (I. G. Y.)
- "I.G.Y. (What a Beautiful World)", a 1982 song by Donald Fagen
- Israel Gay Youth
- Ingenuity (helicopter) (ICAO operator code: IGY), NASA defunct solar-powered autonomous drone helicopter on Mars

== See also ==
- Iggy (disambiguation)
- IGI (disambiguation)
- IG (disambiguation)
- GY (disambiguation), for 1 Gy
- GM LGY engine
