= 2011–12 Australian region cyclone season =

Tropical cyclone season

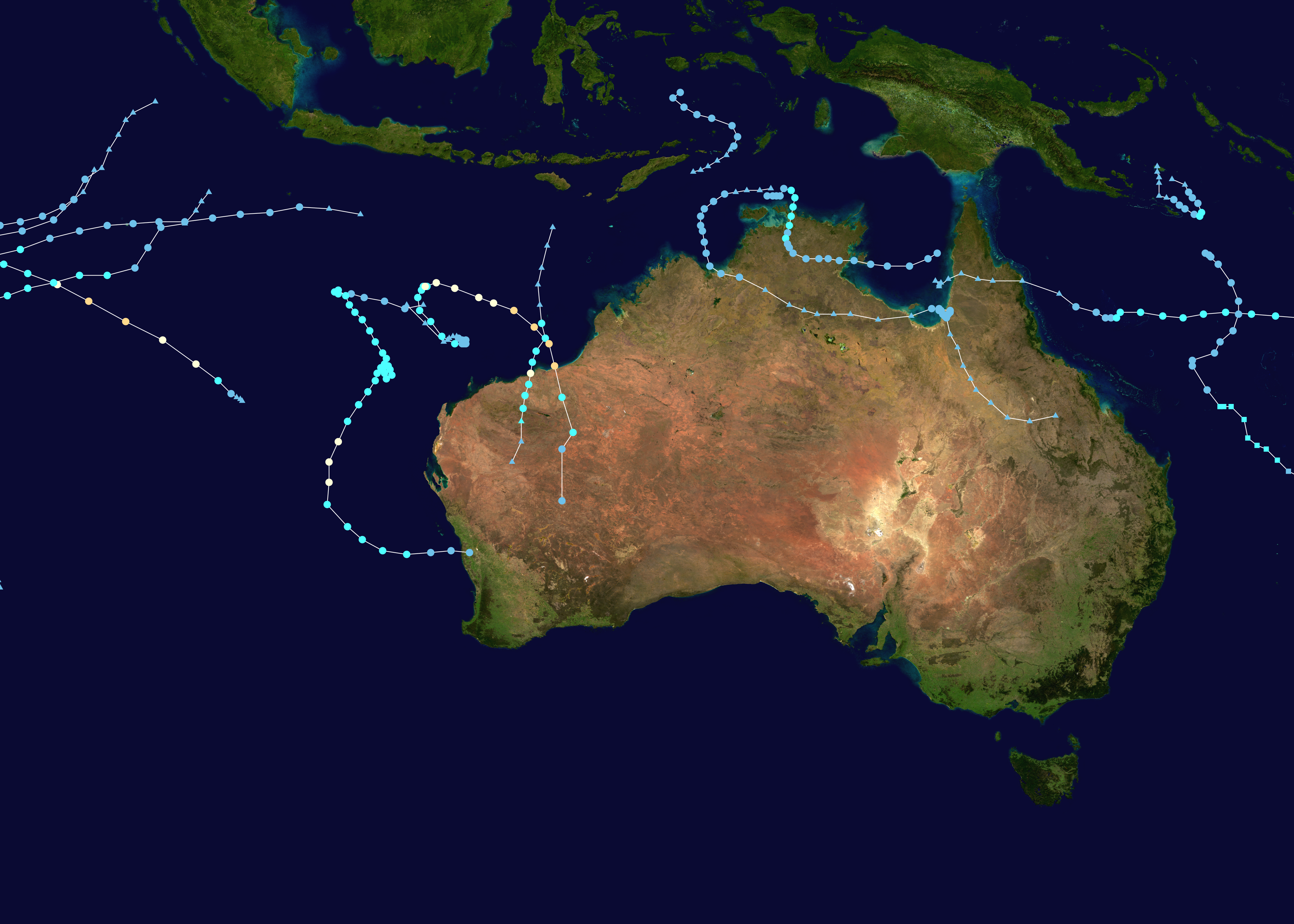
- Season summary map

Seasonal boundaries
- First system formed: 3 December 2011
- Last system dissipated: 30 June 2012

Strongest storm
- Name: Lua
  - Maximum winds: 155 km/h (100 mph) (10-minute sustained)
  - Lowest pressure: 935 hPa (mbar)

Seasonal statistics
- Tropical lows: 21
- Tropical cyclones: 8
- Severe tropical cyclones: 3
- Total fatalities: 16
- Total damage: > $230 million (2012 USD)

Related articles
- 2011–12 South-West Indian Ocean cyclone season; 2011–12 South Pacific cyclone season

The 2011–12 Australian region cyclone season was a below average tropical cyclone season, with 7 cyclones forming rather than the usual 11. It began on 1 November 2011, and ended on 14 May 2012. The regional tropical cyclone operational plan defines a "tropical cyclone year" separately from a "tropical cyclone season"; the "tropical cyclone year" began on 1 July 2011 and ended on 30 June 2012.

The scope of the Australian region is limited to all areas south of the equator, east of 90°E and west of 160°E. This area includes Australia, Papua New Guinea, western parts of the Solomon Islands, East Timor and southern parts of Indonesia.

Tropical cyclones in this area are monitored by five Tropical Cyclone Warning Centres (TCWCs): the Bureau of Meteorology in Perth, Darwin and Brisbane; TCWC Jakarta in Indonesia; and TCWC Port Moresby in Papua New Guinea. The Joint Typhoon Warning Center issues unofficial warnings for the region, designating tropical depressions with the "S" suffix when they form west of 135°E, and the "P" suffix when they form east of 135°E.

== Seasonal forecasts ==
TSR forecasts Date	Tropical storms	Severe Tropical cyclones	Landfalling cyclones	ACE	Ref
Average (1975/76–2010/11)	10.5	5.5	4.5	79	
11 May 2011	11.2	5.9	4.7	–	
4 July 2011	10.6	5.5	4.4	–	
8 September 2011	11.8	6.2	4.9	–	
8 November 2011	12.9	6.8	5.3	–	
7 December 2011	12.9	6.8	5.3	94	
Region		Average	Chance of Above average	Actual activity	Ref
Whole		12	80%	7	
Western		7	65%	5	
North-Western		5	60%	3	
Northern		3	60%	1	
Eastern		4	65%	1	
Total	Forecast Center	Tropical lows	Tropical cyclones	Severe tropical cyclones	Ref
Actual activity:	BoM	20	7	3	
Actual activity:	JTWC	17	8	4	

During each tropical cyclone year, Australia's Bureau of Meteorology National Climate Centre (BoM), the Guy Carpenter Asia-Pacific Climate Impact Centre, New Zealand's National Institute of Water and Atmospheric Research (NIWA) and partners issue seasonal forecasts for the Australian region and its various subregions. Since a tropical cyclone can move through a region, the actual number of tropical cyclones in a region include any that form in or move into a region from another.

=== Bureau of Meteorology ===
In October 2011, ahead of the tropical cyclone season starting on 1 November, the BoM issued seasonal forecasts for the whole Australian region, one for each of the subregions Western, North-Western, Northern and Eastern Australia with each one covering the whole tropical cyclone year. For each forecast they took into account, the current neutral ENSO conditions to weak La Niña conditions that had been observed during that summer. For the whole region they predicted that there was an 80% chance that the season would be above average.

For the Western region between 90°E and 125°E, the BoM forecast that the area would see activity near to or slightly above the average, with a 35% chance of a below average cyclone activity. For the North-Western subregion between 105°E and 130°E, it was predicted that there was a 60% chance of above average tropical cyclone activity, while TCWC Perth noted that there was a likelihood of two tropical cyclones and one severe tropical cyclone impacting Western Australia. The Northern Territory which was defined as being between as being 125°E and 142.5°E had a 60% chance of being above average, while the Eastern region had a 65% chance of having an above average tropical cyclone season. During February, after Cyclones Heidi and Iggy had threatened Western Australia, it was reported that there was a likelihood of at least one more coastal impact and a significant risk that it could be a severe tropical cyclone. The BoM also issued a seasonal forecasts for the South Pacific region between 142.5°E and 165°E and one for the Eastern Southern Pacific region between 165°E and 120°W. The outlook called for a westward shift in tropical cyclone activity with a 65% chance that the Western Pacific Region will see more than the average number of tropical cyclones while there was a 40% chance that the Eastern Pacific Region will see above average number.

== Systems ==
=== Severe Tropical Cyclone Alenga ===
- Category 3 severe tropical cyclone (Australian scale)
- Category 2 tropical cyclone (SSHWS)
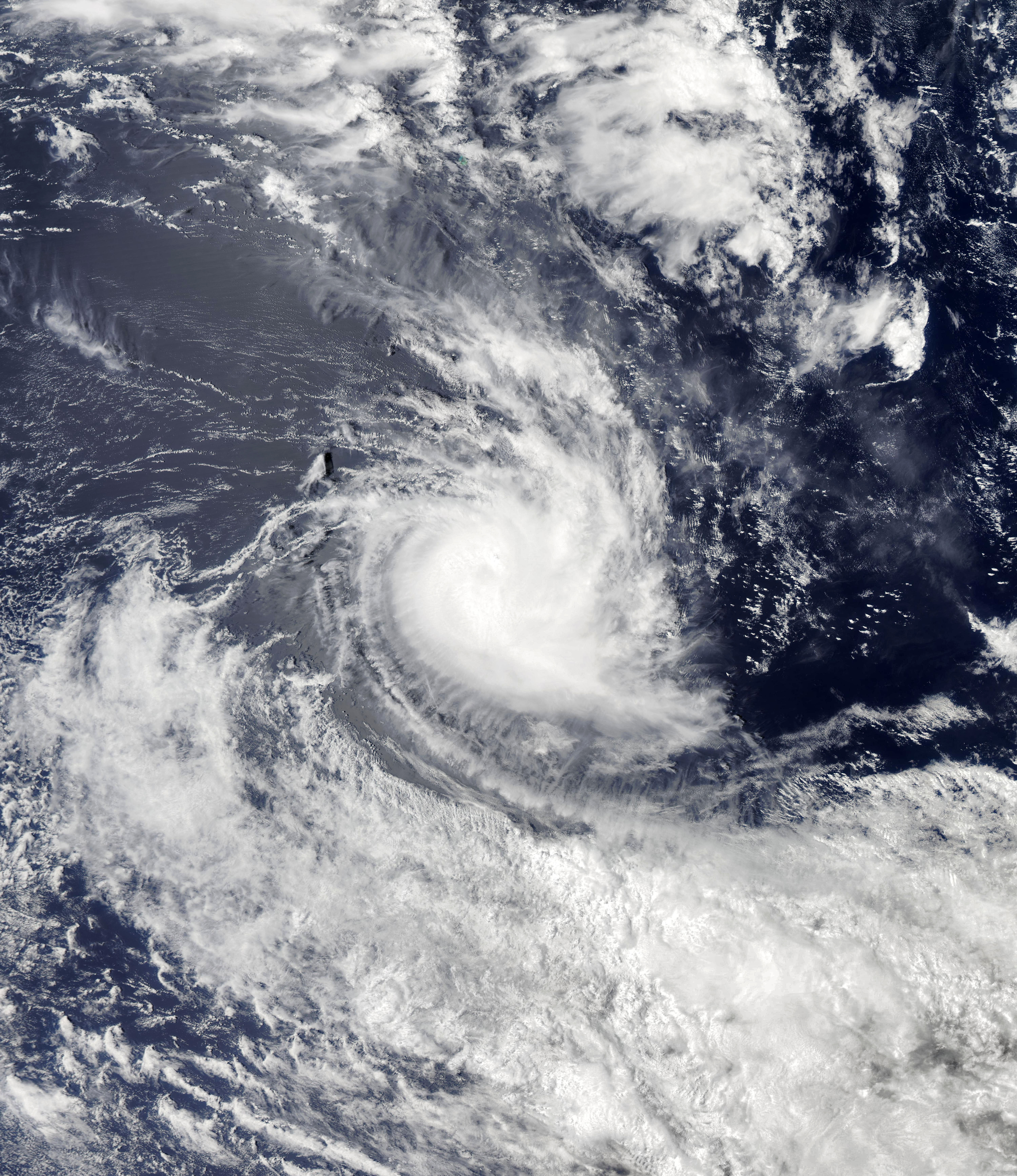
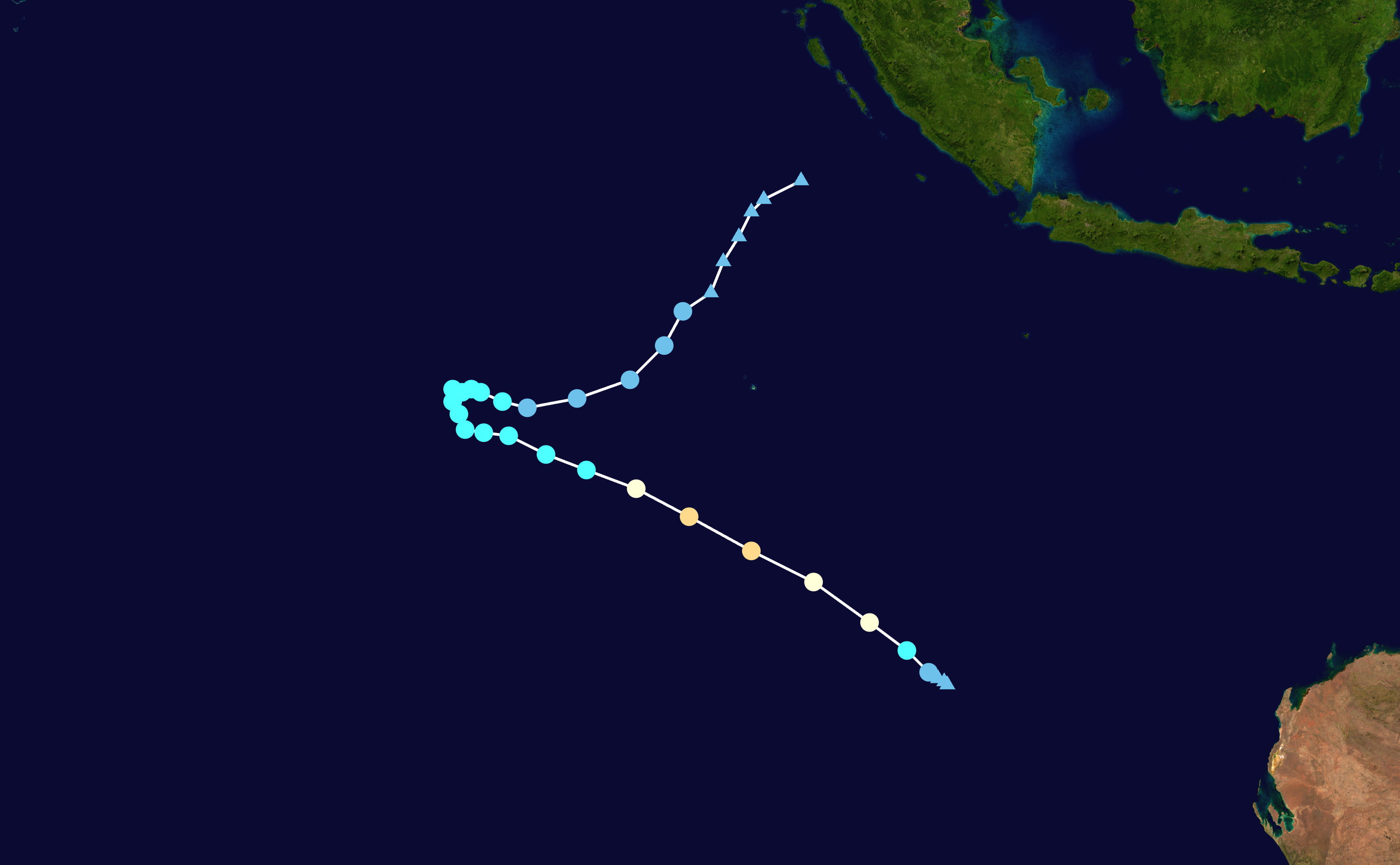
- Duration: 3 December – 11 December (out of basin 4–7 December)
- Peak intensity: 140 km/h (85 mph) (10-min); 972 hPa (mbar)

On 3 December, TCWC Perth and TCWC Jakarta started monitoring a tropical low that had developed about 1220 km (760 mi) to the southwest of Jakarta, Indonesia. Over the next few days, the low moved towards the southeast, while the system's low-level circulation centre gradually developed further, in an area of moderate vertical wind shear. During the next day, the low moved out of the Australian region and moved into the South-West Indian Ocean, where it was named Alenga by the Mauritius Meteorological Service on 5 December. During that day, RSMC La Réunion reported that Alenga reached an initial 10-minute peak windspeed of 100 km/h (60 mph), as it started to recurve and move towards the Australian region. The system then weakened slightly, before re-intensifying and surpassing its initial peak intensity, as it moved back into the Australian region during 7 December. Later that day, the JTWC reported that Alenga had become equivalent to a category one hurricane on the Saffir–Simpson hurricane wind scale (SSHWS). During the next day, TCWC Perth reported that Alenga had become a Category 3 Severe Tropical Cyclone, and reached its 10-minute peak windspeeds of 150 km/h (95 mph) before the JTWC also reported that Alenga had intensified further and peaked with 1-minute windspeeds of 175 km/h (110 mph), and had become equivalent to a category 3 severe tropical cyclone, on the SSHWS. Alenga then started to rapidly weaken as it moved into an area of higher vertical wind shear, with convection diminishing and the low-level circulation centre becoming elongated. On 9 December, TCWC Perth reported that Alenga had degenerated into a tropical low, while the JTWC followed suit and issued their final advisory on Alenga. TCWC Perth then tracked the remnants for another three days, in their tropical weather outlooks, before dropping it on 12 December. Alenga brought severe storms to Perth on 12 and 13 December.

=== Tropical Low Fina ===
- Tropical low (Australian scale)
- Subtropical storm (SSHWS)
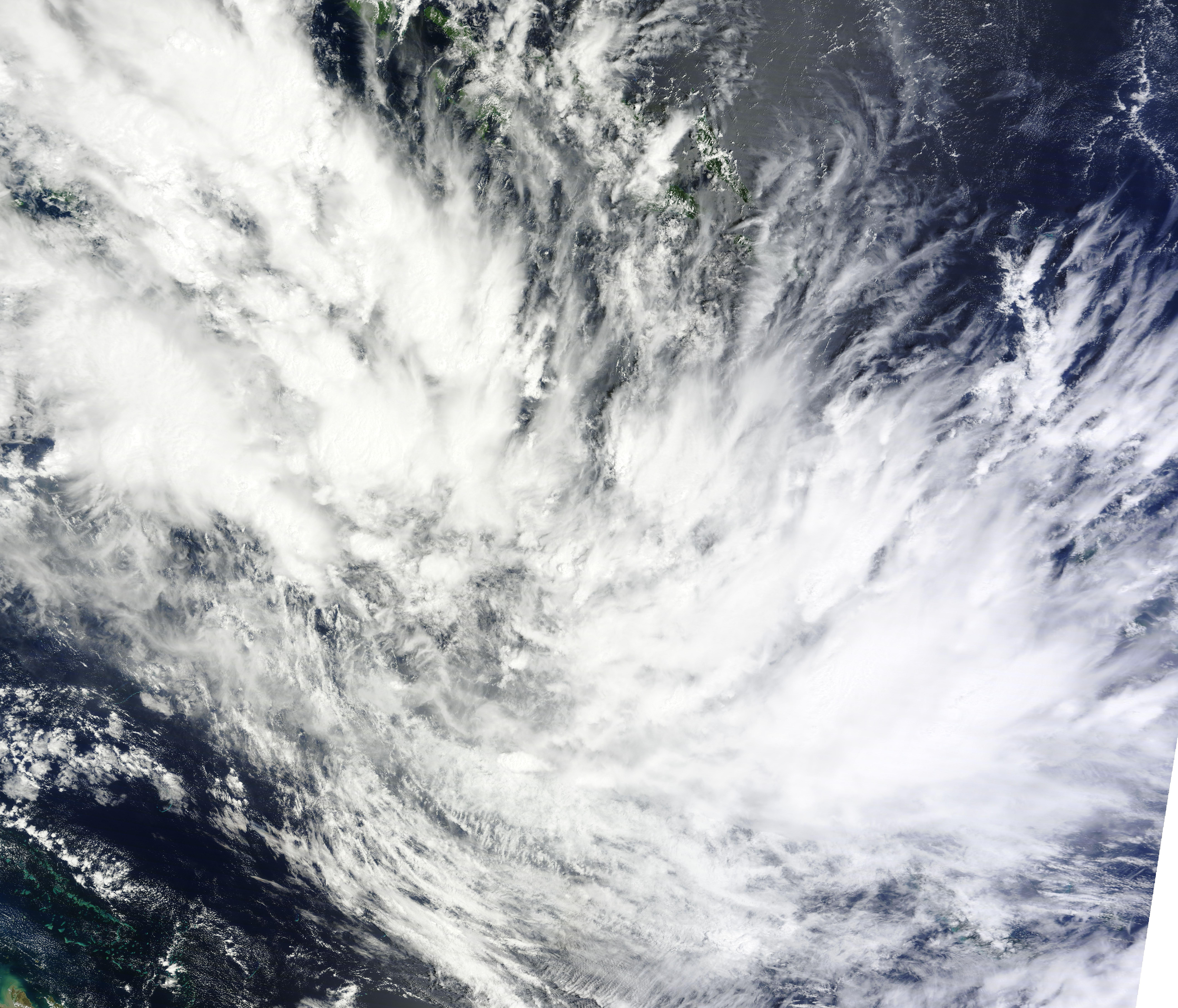
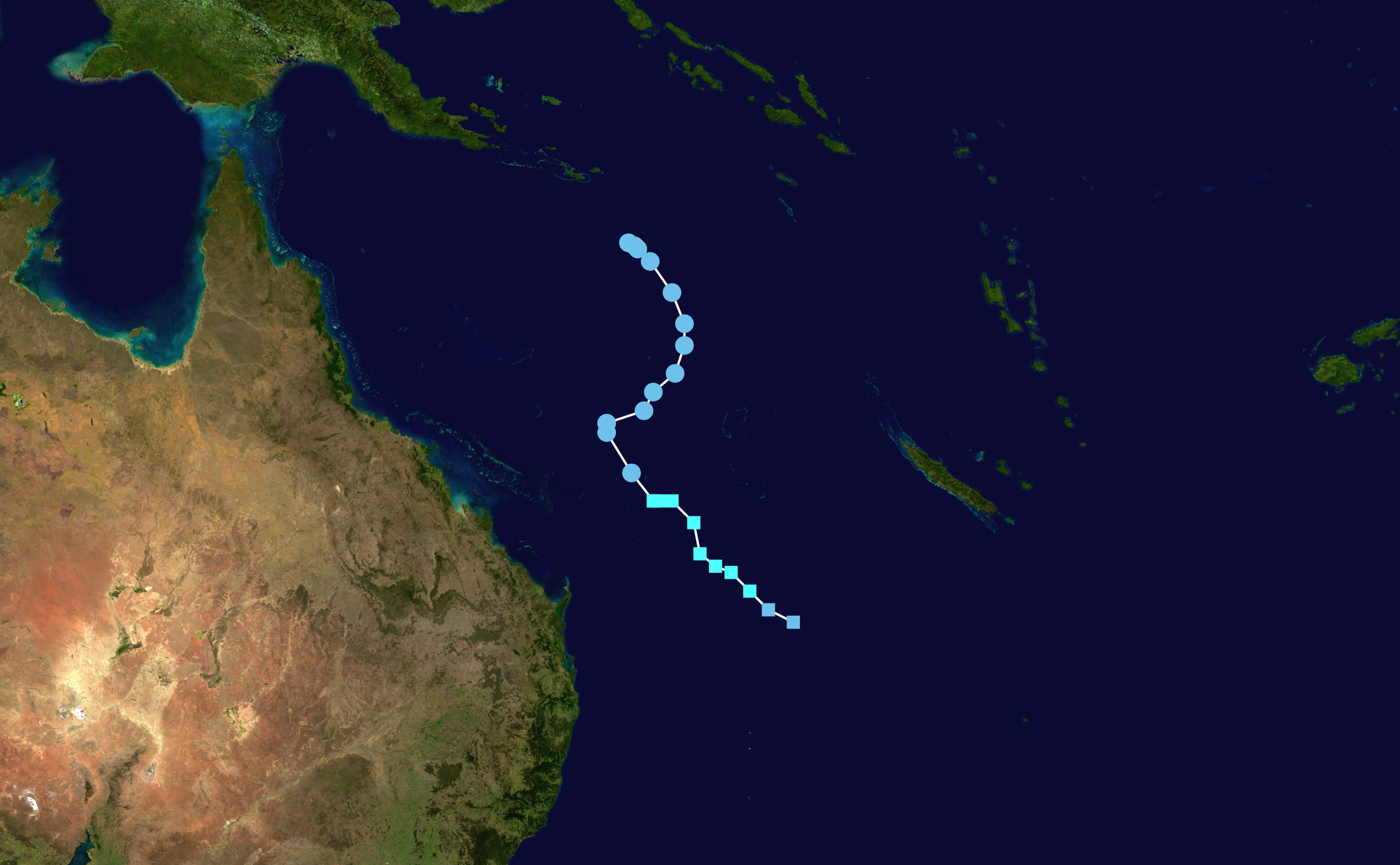
- Duration: 20 December – 25 December
- Peak intensity: 85 km/h (50 mph) (10-min); 990 hPa (mbar)

On 18 December, TCWC Brisbane reported that a tropical low had developed within the South Pacific convergence zone, to the southeast of Port Moresby, in Papua New Guinea. Over the next few days, the low moved towards the south-southwest under the influence of a weak upper ridge of high pressure in an area of weak vertical wind shear. On 20 December, as convection had consolidated over the systems low level circulation centre, the JTWC issued a Tropical Cyclone Formation Alert on the system. During the next day TCWC Brisbane reported that the low had become a category one tropical cyclone and named it Fina during the next day as it had 10-minute windspeeds of 65 km/h (40 mph). However, as soon as Fina was named, it started weakening as an upper-level trough of low pressure moving through eastern Australia, increased windshear over the system, which meant that Fina's low level circulation centre became exposed, with convection displaced over 135 kilometres (85 mi) from the centre. As a result of this, the JTWC decided to cancel their Tropical Cyclone Formation Alert late on 22 December, while TCWC Brisbane reported that Fina had degenerated into an extratropical cyclone. Over the next few days Cyclone Fina developed storm force winds and produced dangerous surfing conditions in southeast Queensland over the Christmas holiday. In post-analysis in early 2012, the BoM downgraded Fina to a tropical low.

=== Tropical Low 03U (Benilde) ===
- Tropical low (Australian scale)
- Tropical depression (SSHWS)
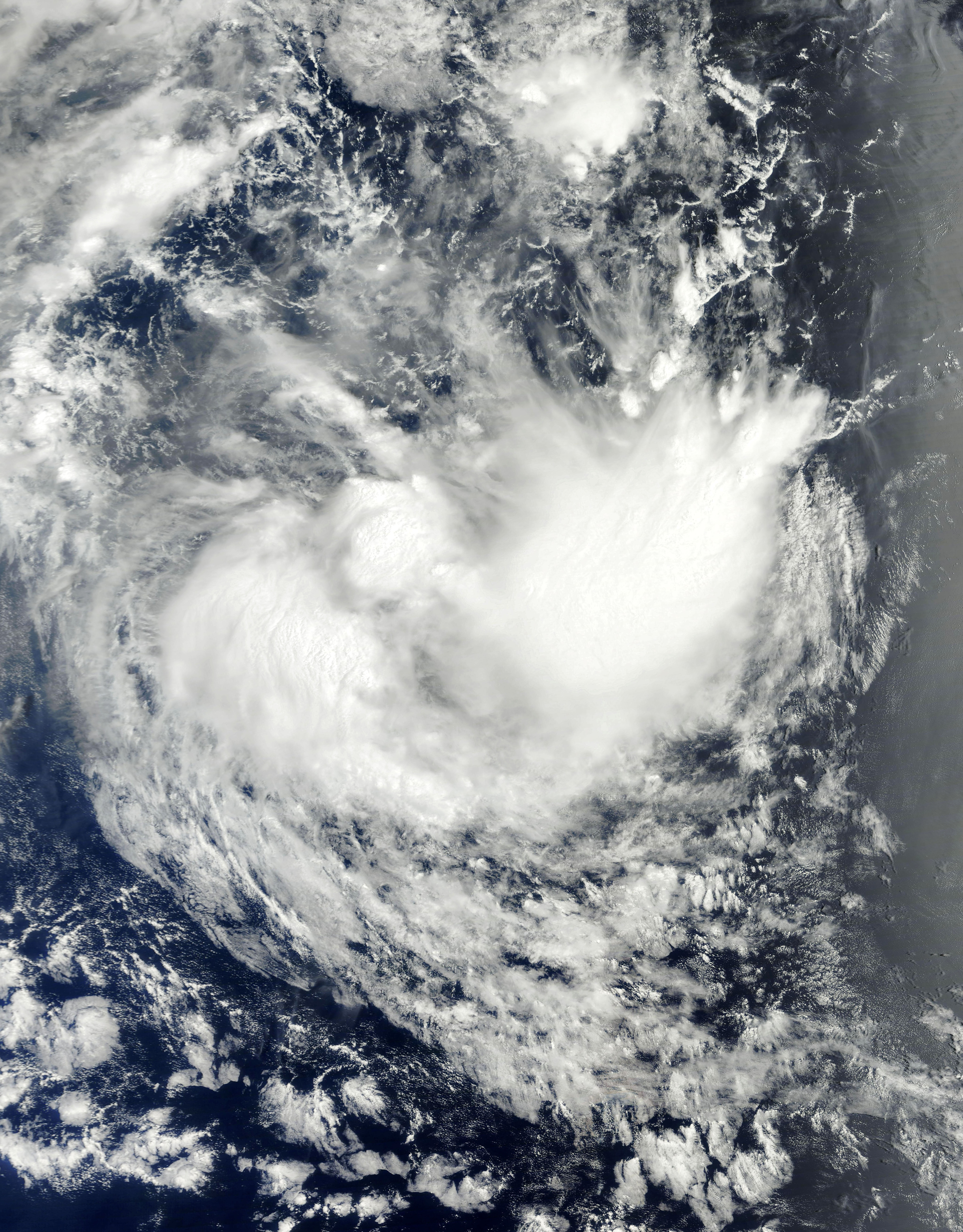
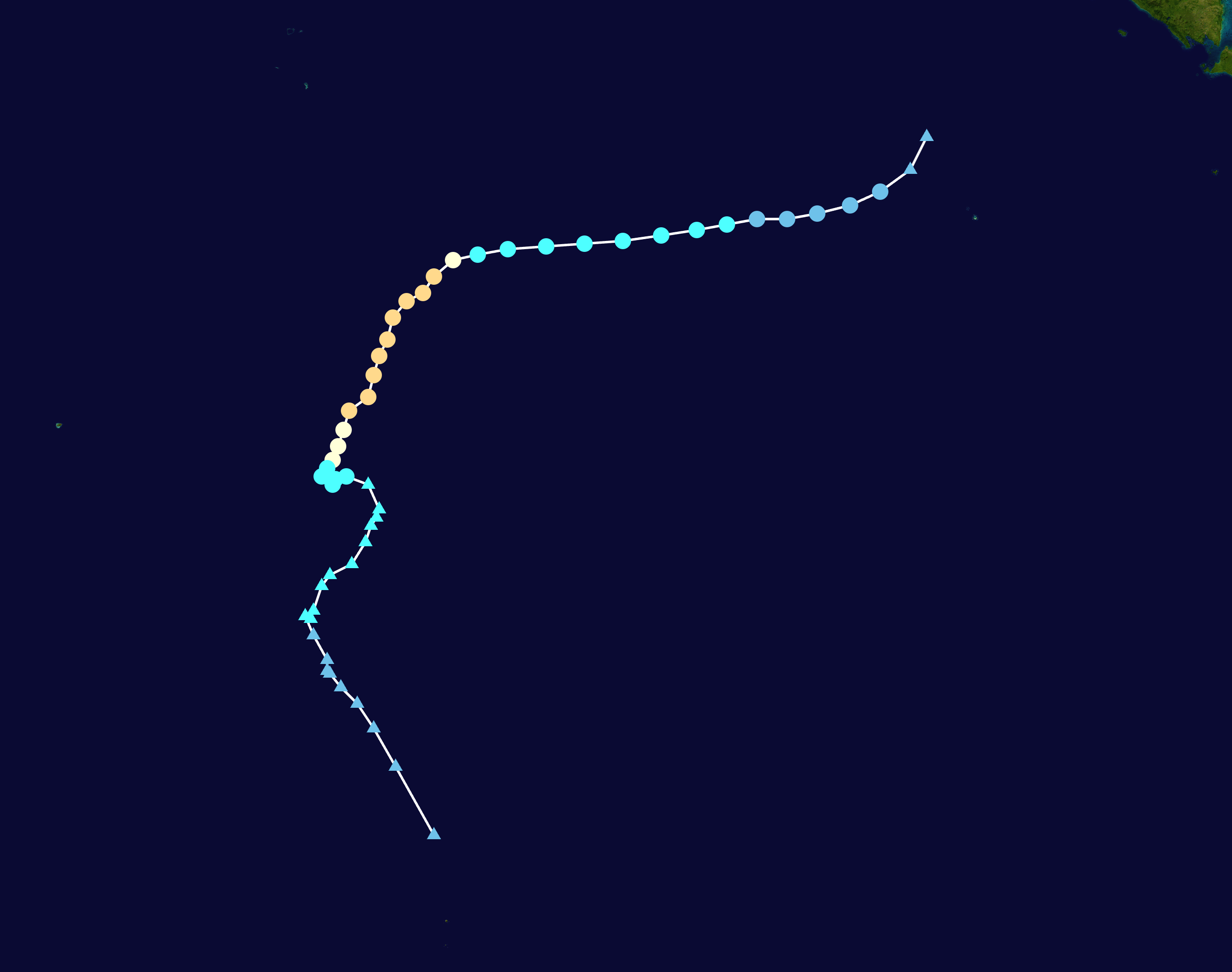
- Duration: 21 December – 28 December (Exited basin)
- Peak intensity: 55 km/h (35 mph) (1-min); 1000 hPa (mbar)

On 21 December, TCWC Perth reported within their tropical weather outlooks that a tropical low was developing about 770 km (410 mi) to the northeast of the West Island of the Cocos (Keeling) Islands. Over the next few days they continued to monitor it, as the system slowly moved west-southwestward. On 28 December it moved into RSMC La Réunion's area of responsibility, where it commenced a strengthening trend.

=== Tropical Cyclone Grant ===
- Category 2 tropical cyclone (Australian scale)
- Tropical storm (SSHWS)
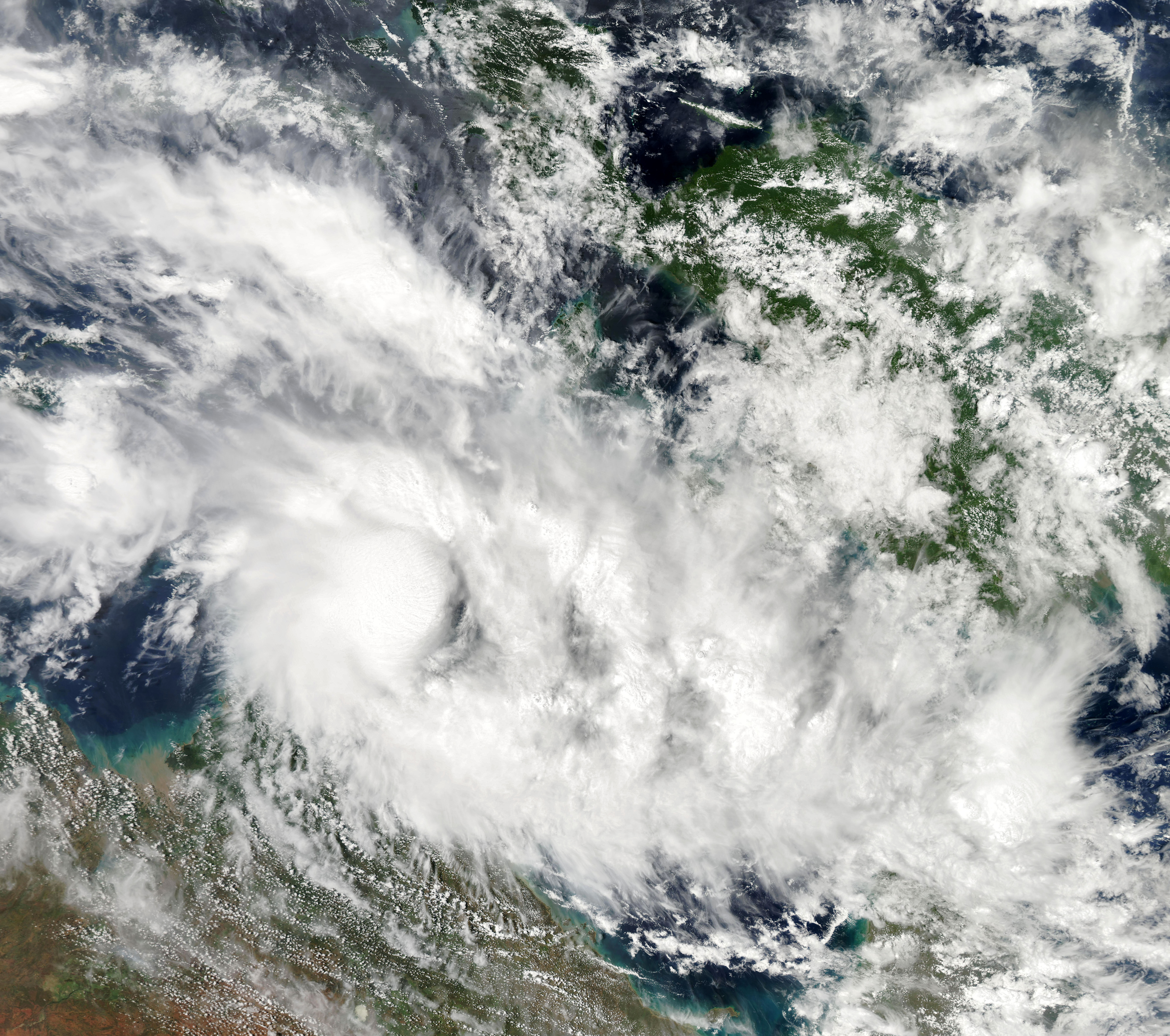
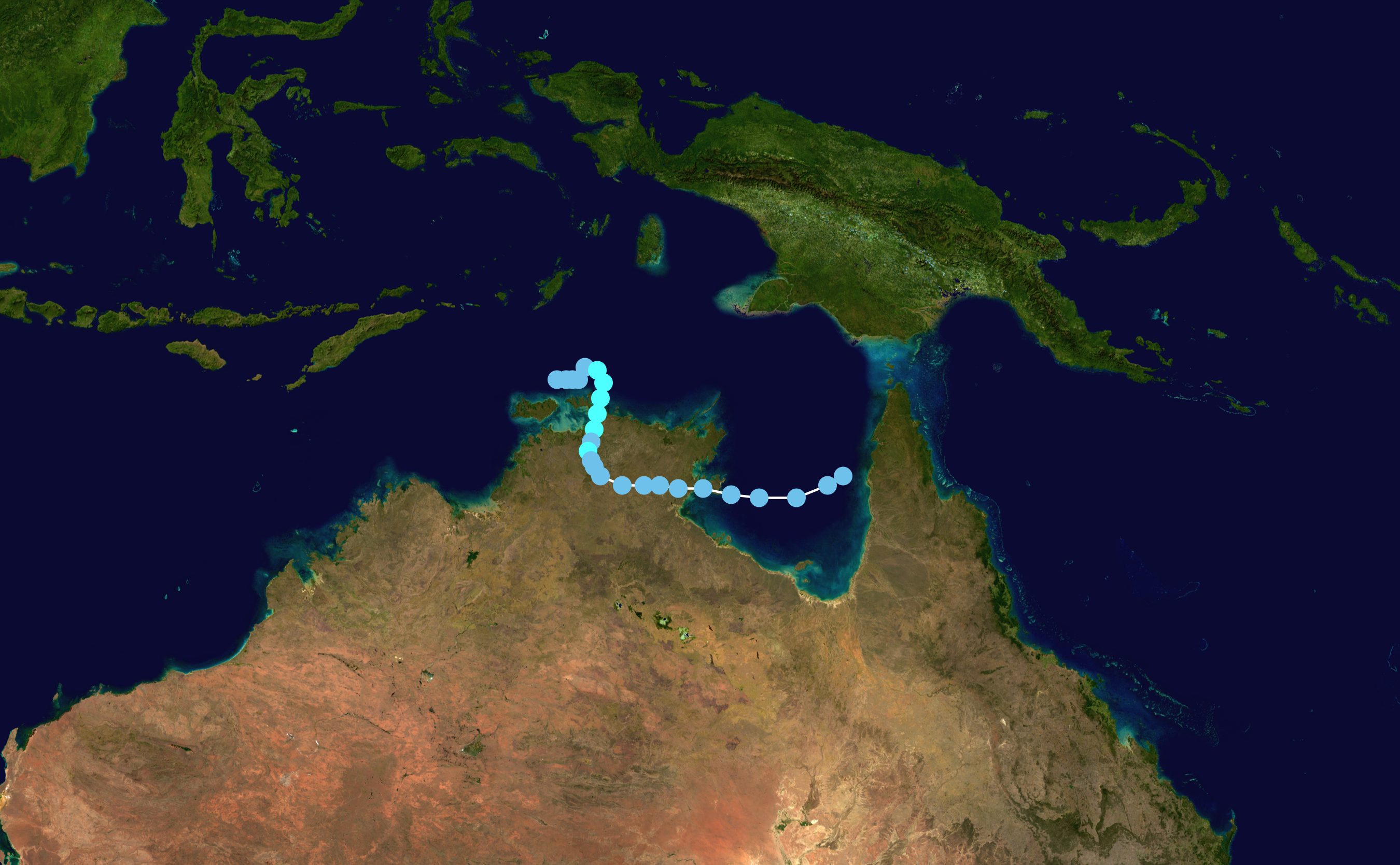
- Duration: 21 December – 2 January
- Peak intensity: 110 km/h (70 mph) (10-min); 976 hPa (mbar)

An area of thunderstorms north-northeast of Darwin was designated Tropical Low 04U by TCWC Darwin on 21 December. Tropical Low 04U developed into Tropical Cyclone Grant on the morning of 25 December and moved slowly towards the Cobourg Peninsula. It reached Category 2 strength in the afternoon of 25 December. The system crossed Van Diemen Gulf and made a second landfall east of Point Stuart in the early morning of 26 December. Shortly thereafter the cyclone was downgraded to Category 1 and by the afternoon of that day it was downgraded to an ex-tropical low. On 28 December in the evening, the system moved back onto the waters of the Gulf of Carpentaria, and was downgraded to a tropical low. Early on 30 December, Grant made another landfall south of Weipa. The system moved into the Coral Sea, until Grant underwent an extratropical transition on 2 January 2012. Later on the same day, the extratropical remnant of Grant dissipated.

A cyclone watch was declared between Dundee Beach and Nhulunbuy, whilst a cyclone warning was issued for areas between Cape Fourcroy and Milingimbi including the Tiwi Islands. A gale warning had been issued for Darwin and the Tiwi Islands on 24 December. Jabiru Airport had received 71.0 mm (2.80 in) of rain by 9:00am on 26 December. Ediths Fall Ridge recorded 385.0 mm (15.16 in) of rainfall, which produced damaging flooding. Flooding associated with the system in the Katherine area cut off the Stuart Highway, washed cars off bridges and derailed a train. The Darwin railway line was severely damaged by the derailment of a Genesee & Wyoming freight train. The Ghan was forced to terminate with 200 passengers in Katherine. One week after the cyclone had passed freight companies were poised to raise transportation costs as shipping to Darwin would need to be done by road. The railway between Katherine and Darwin would be out of service until the end of January 2012. Grant later produced heavy rainfall in the Roper-McArthur River districts.

=== Severe Tropical Cyclone Heidi ===
- Category 3 severe tropical cyclone (Australian scale)
- Category 1 tropical cyclone (SSHWS)
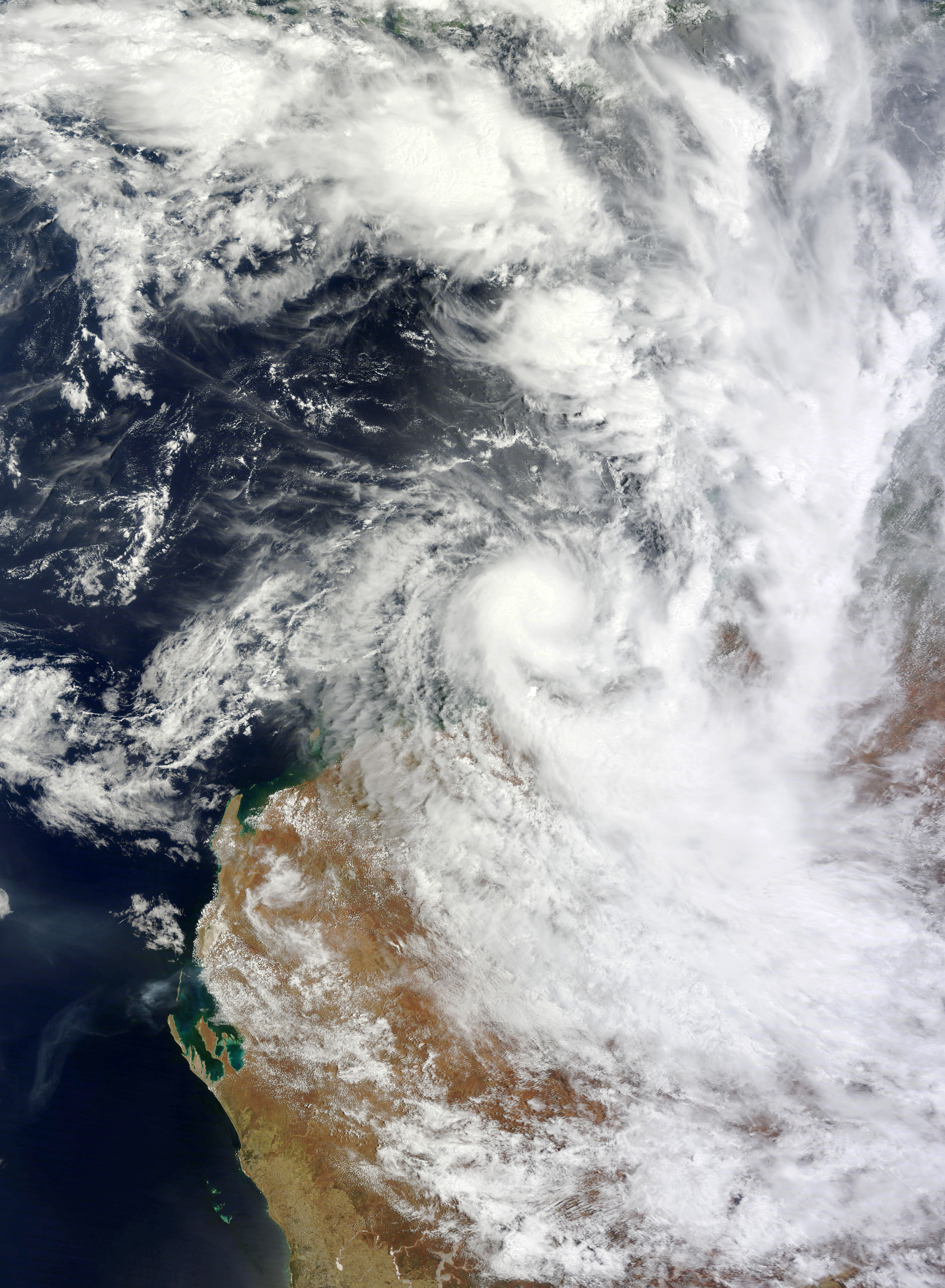
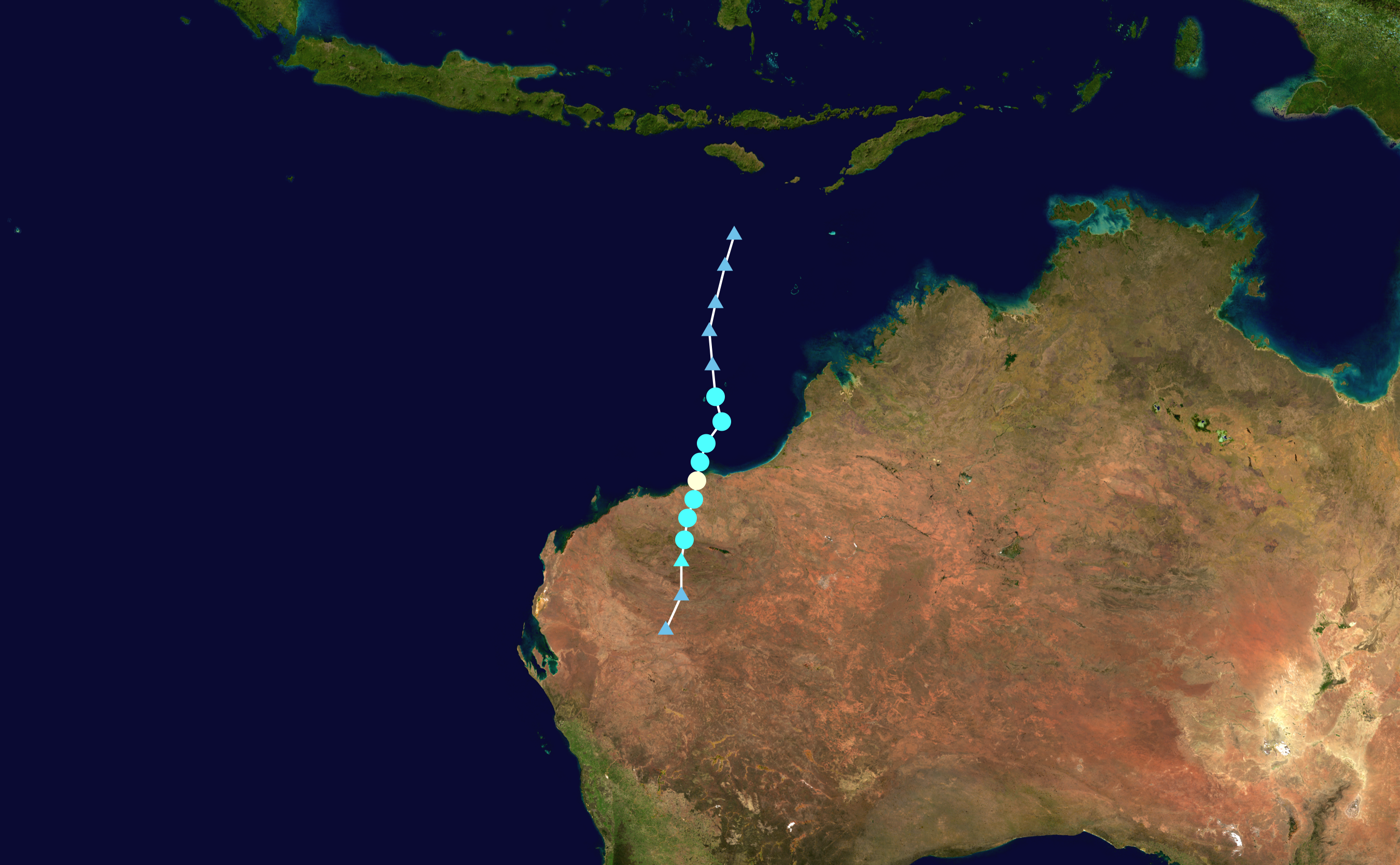
- Duration: 9 January – 13 January
- Peak intensity: 150 km/h (90 mph) (10-min); 960 hPa (mbar)

Early on 9 January, both the JTWC and TCWC Perth started to monitor a tropical low that had developed within a monsoon trough, about 950 km (590 mi) to the north of Port Hedland in Western Australia. Over the next two days, the low gradually moved southwards and developed in favourable conditions into a tropical cyclone, before late on 10 January, it was assigned the designation 06S by the JTWC and named Heidi by TCWC Perth.

In preparation for the cyclone Port Hedland Port Authority closed the port, oilfields and gas production off the North-West coast were halted, and flights from Perth to Port Hedland were cancelled.

In the early morning of 12 January the system made landfall just east of Port Hedland and after a few hours the system was downgraded to Category 1 cyclone. Port Hedland received 128.0 mm (5.04 in) of rain by 9:00 am with gusts of 131 km/h (81 mph) and Wallal Downs recording 166.0 mm (6.54 in) of rain. More than 3,500 homes and businesses in Port Hedland were left without power. Late on 12 January the system was downgraded to a tropical low about 45 kilometres (30 mi) northeast of Tom Price. Flood Warnings continued for the Ashburton and De Grey River areas. On 13 January, the remnants of Heidi continued to move south through the Gascoyne region with widespread rainfall totals of up to 30 mm (1.2 in). Significant rainfall was recorded in the Gascoyne region through early morning 14 January at the homestead of Mount Vernon with 117.0 mm (4.61 in) of rain and Tangadee with 74.0 mm (2.91 in) of rain. In the early morning of 15 January a severe weather warning was cancelled for northeast Gascoyne. However showers from the remnants of the tropical low still persisted.

Ahead of Cyclone Heidi making landfall during 12 January, various tropical cyclone alerts and warnings were issued for parts of the Pilbara Coast between Wallal and Dampier.

Track data subsequently released by the BoM indicated that Heidi's winds were equivalent to a Category 3 system.

=== Tropical Low 10U ===
- Tropical low (Australian scale)
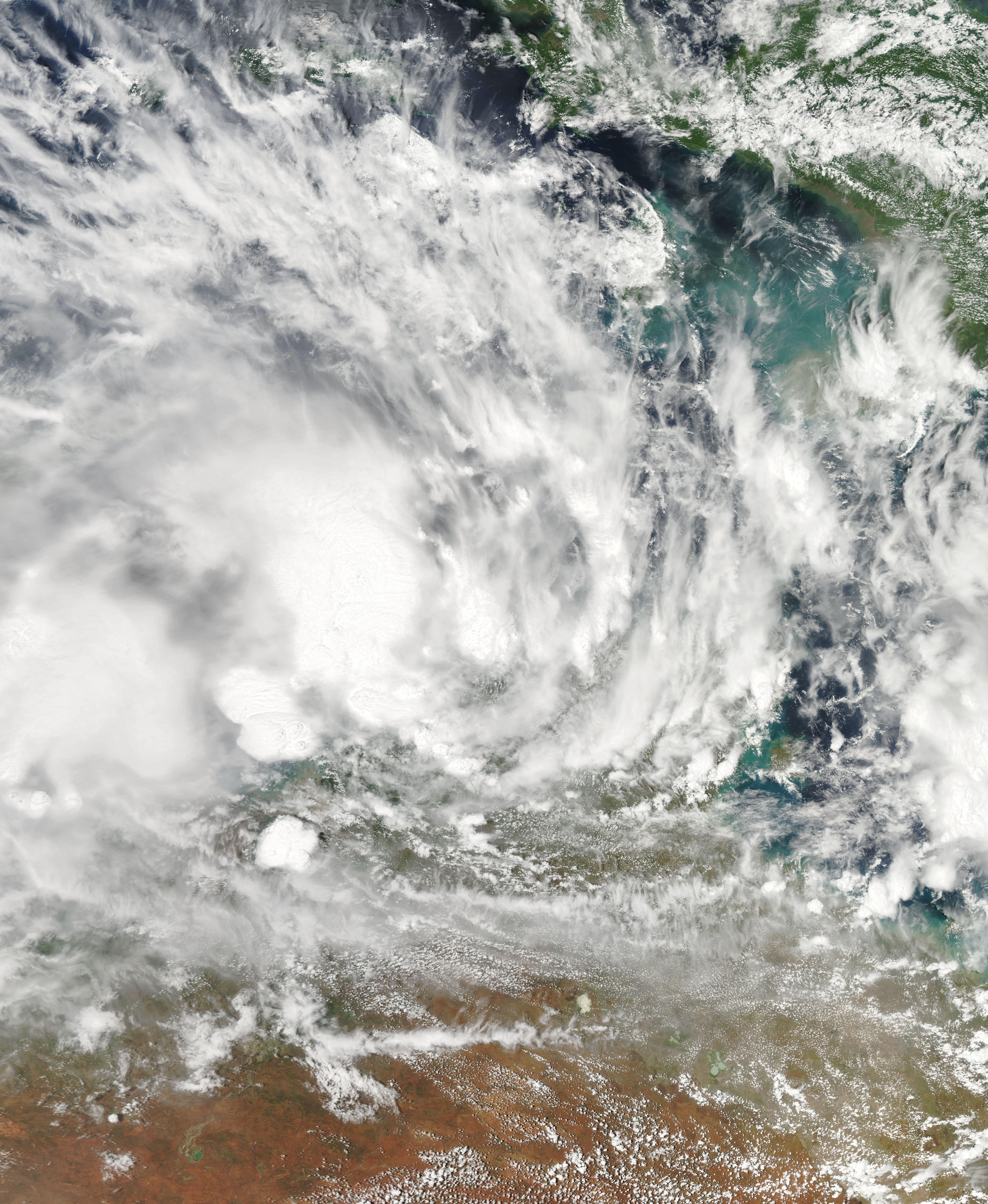
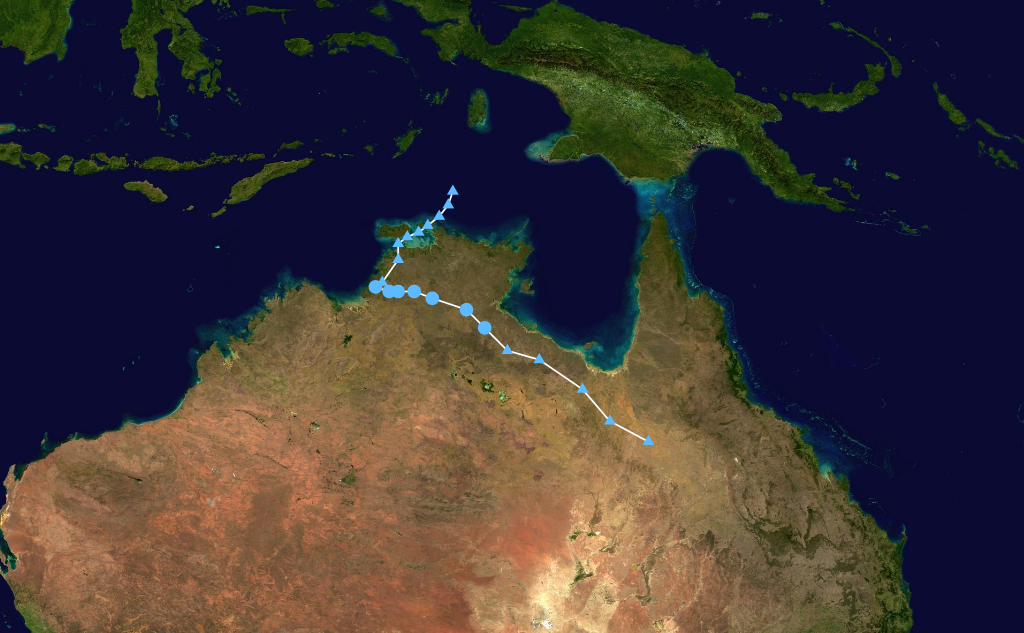
- Duration: 22 January – 27 January
- Peak intensity: Winds not specified; 997 hPa (mbar)

On 22 January, a tropical low formed in a monsoonal trough over the Arafura Sea. The low then slowly moved to the south and west over the next few days as gale-force westerly winds developed to the north. This storm made 2 landfalls. The first one was on 24 January around 10:00 am when the storm made landfall over Melville Island. Later that night, the storm made its final landfall in the late afternoon hours of 24 January.

This storm brought heavy rain and strong winds to Darwin. This led to the temporary closure of the Territory Wildlife Park and the George Brown Botanic Gardens on 26 January. Flights out of Darwin International Airport had delays and cancellations. Coastal regions around Darwin also experienced significant beach erosion.

=== Tropical Cyclone Iggy ===
- Category 2 tropical cyclone (Australian scale)
- Category 1 tropical cyclone (SSHWS)
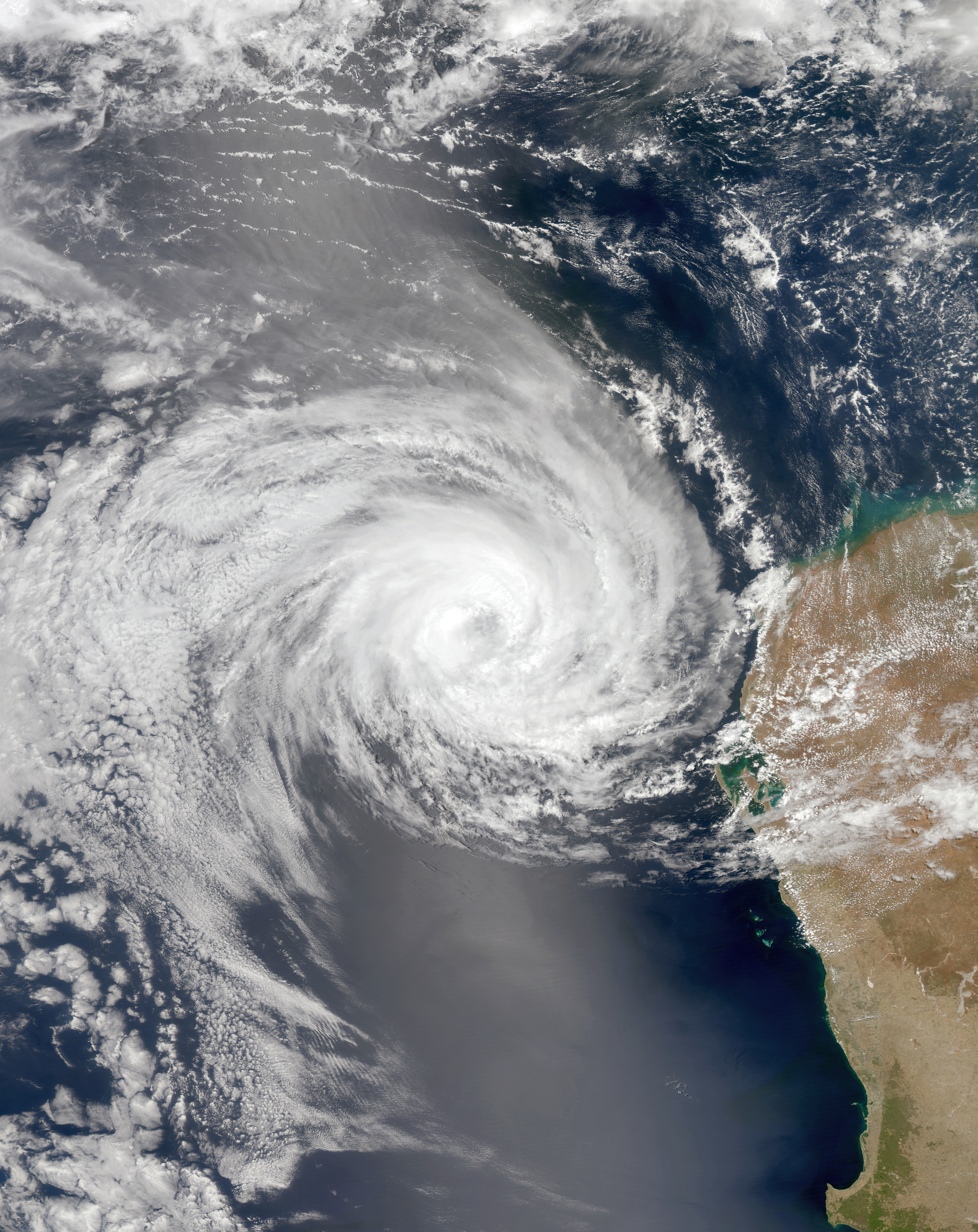
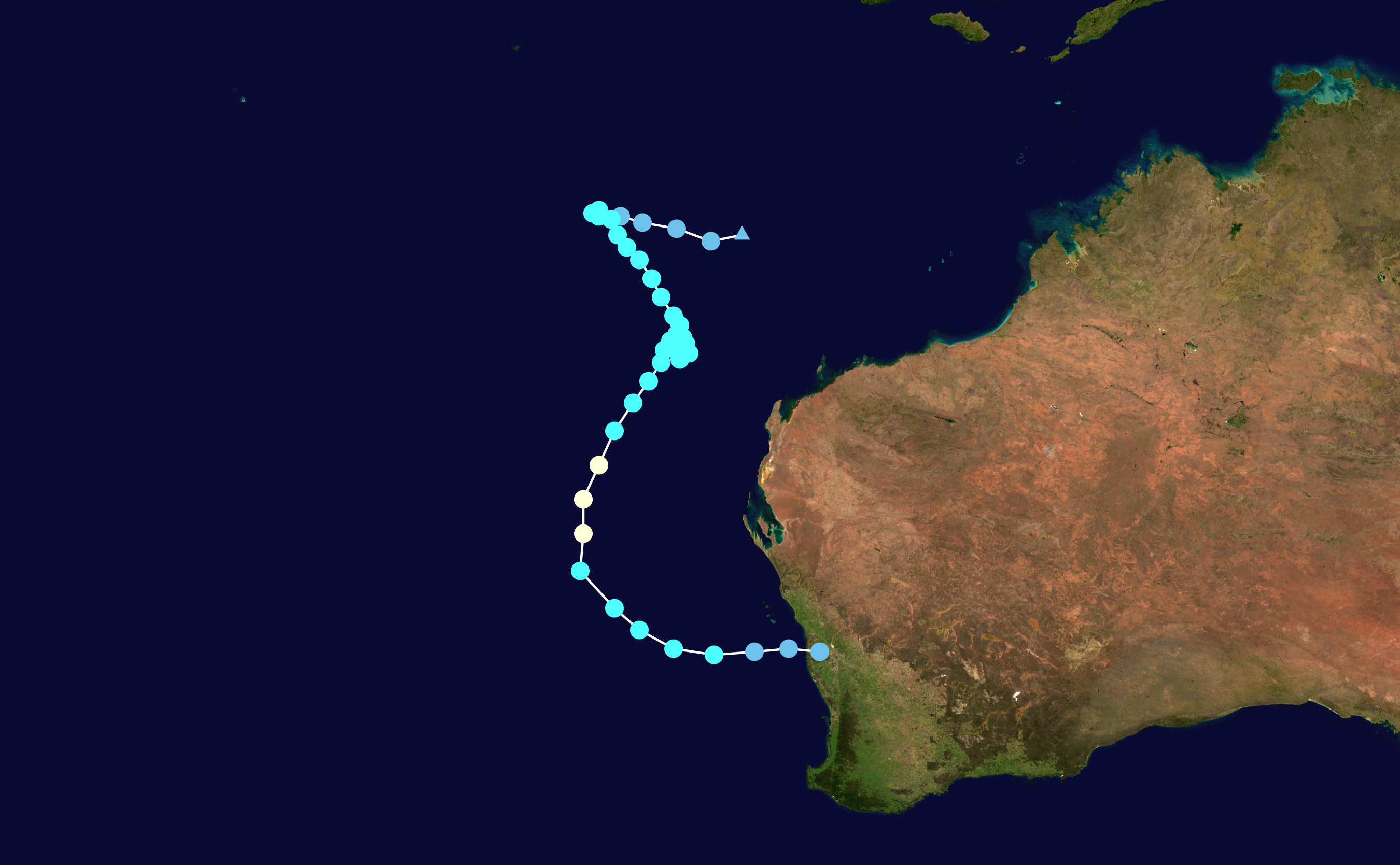
- Duration: 24 January – 3 February
- Peak intensity: 110 km/h (70 mph) (10-min); 970 hPa (mbar)

On 21 January, JTWC reported that an area of convection with a weak low level circulation had developed about 480 kilometres (300 mi) from Port Hedland. By 24 January, TCWC Perth reported that a tropical low had formed, and that it was 720 kilometres (445 mi) north northwest of Exmouth moving west at 23 km/h (14 mph). The tropical low was then given the identification 11U. Late on 25 January, the JTWC upgraded it into a tropical depression and designated as 09S. Soon after the system strengthened and the TCWC Perth had named the system Tropical Cyclone Iggy. The system was located 960 kilometres (595 mi) northwest of Exmouth, moving west at 5 km/h (3.1 mph).

During its formative stages, Iggy was responsible for triggering severe weather, including tornadoes and flooding in Java, Bali, and in Lombok, Indonesia, causing the deaths of at least 16 people, and the destruction of thousands of houses.

Early on 26 January, the system began to recurve and headed slowly towards the Pilbara coast. Early on 27 January, the system was upgraded to a Category 2 cyclone, while located 610 kilometres (380 mi) northwest of Exmouth moving east southeast. By late 27 January a cyclone warning had been issued from Mardie to Ningaloo. On 28 January, Iggy reached its peak intensity, with a minimum central pressure of 970 mbars. By 29 January, the system became stationary. Wind shear and lower sea surface temperatures, which the cyclone remained stationary over inhibited intensification. Later in the day, the system weakened into a Category 1 cyclone. On 30 January, after regaining forward momentum, the system began moving southwest at 6 km/h (3.7 mph), and restrengthened into a Category 2 system. Early on 31 January, the system had once again weakened into a Category 1 cyclone, only to reintensify into a Category 2 cyclone on 1 February.

Iggy eventually lost cyclone strength on 2 February, as it made landfall near Jurien Bay. A Severe Weather Warning for damaging winds and heavy rain was issued for the area bound by Kalbarri, Morawa, Wongan Hills, Narrogin and Harvey including Geraldton, Perth (the first ex-tropical cyclone to affect the region since Bianca) and Mandurah. The town of Lancelin received 98.0 mm (3.86 in) of rain. On 3 February, Iggy dissipated inland.

=== Tropical Cyclone Jasmine ===
- Category 2 tropical cyclone (Australian scale)
- Tropical storm (SSHWS)
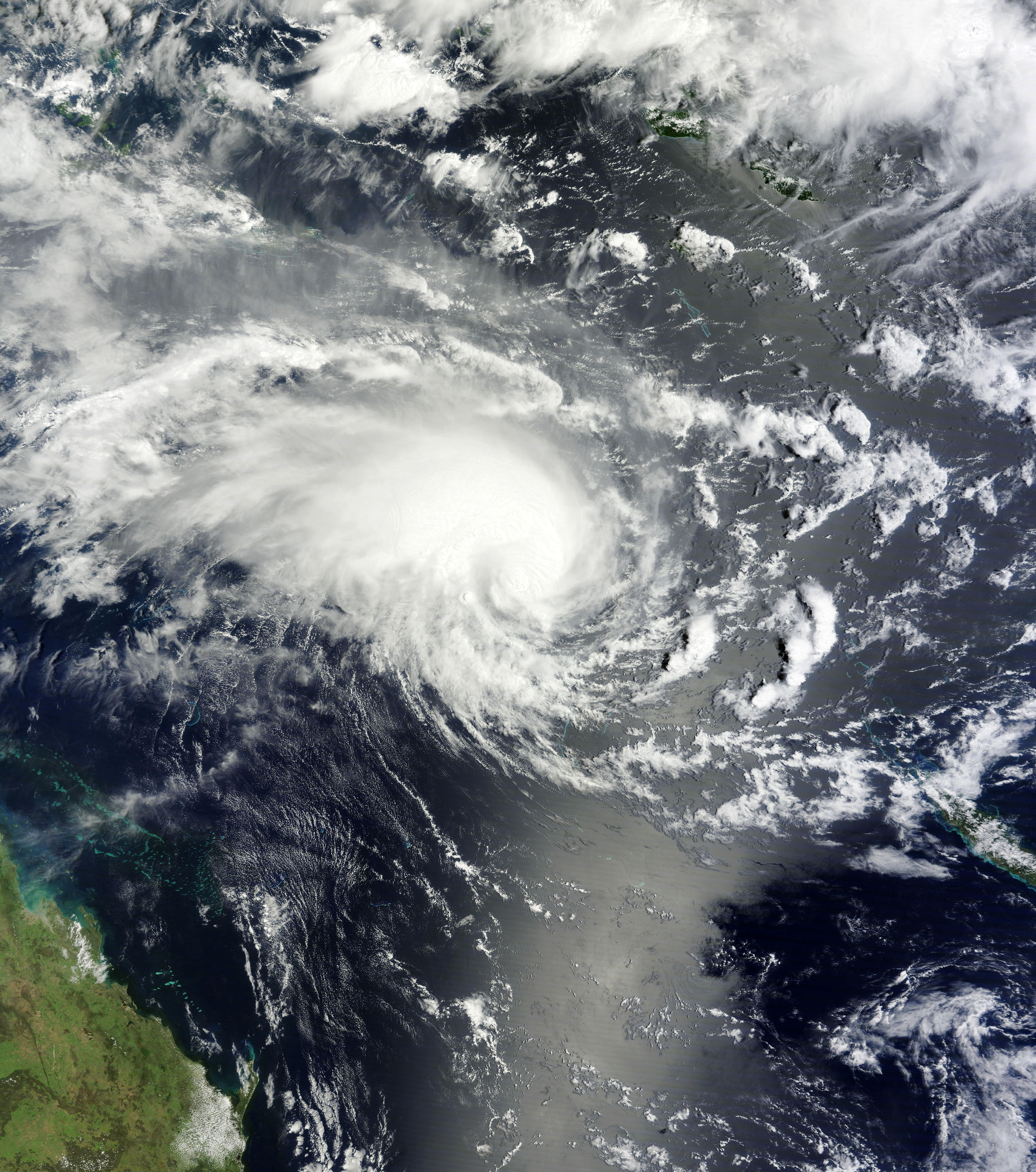
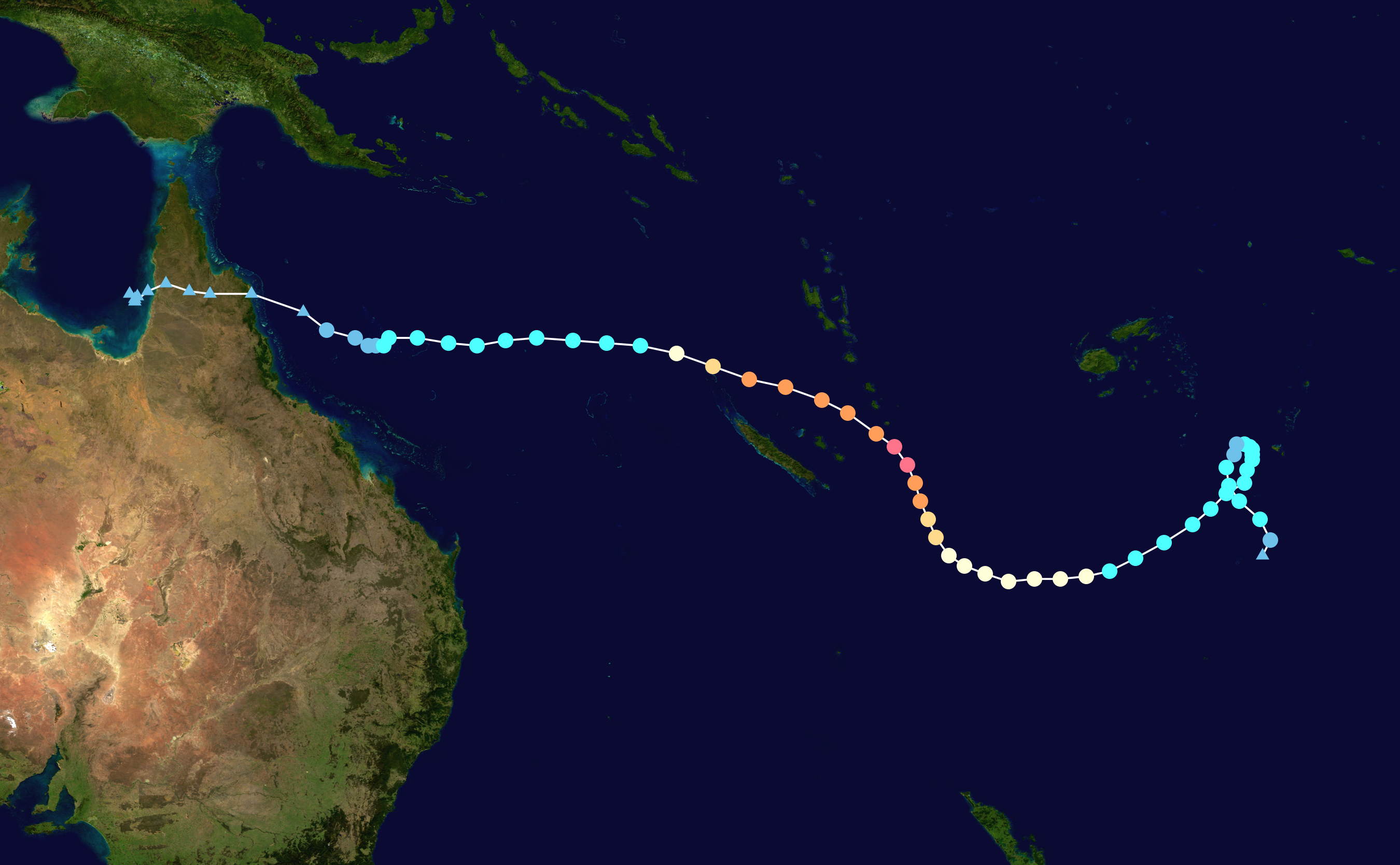
- Duration: 1 February – 6 February (Exited basin)
- Peak intensity: 110 km/h (70 mph) (10-min); 977 hPa (mbar)

Severe Tropical Cyclone Jasmine was a long–lived annular tropical cyclone that affected several countries, particularly Vanuatu and Tonga, over a 19-day span. The sixth cyclone of the season, Cyclone Jasmine developed from an area of disturbed weather on 1 February in the Gulf of Carpentaria. Initially, the storm moved towards the east and across the Cape York Peninsula. Dry air and wind shear prevented the system from strengthening significantly, but a moisture field over the Australian continent helped the storm maintain its intensity. Wind shear would later be subdued, allowing Jasmine to strengthen quicker. On 5 February, Jasmine reached its peak intensity in the Australian basin as a Category 2 on the Australian tropical cyclone intensity scale, with 10-minute sustained winds of 95 m/h (60 mph). After moving to the southeast in response to a nearby subtropical ridge, Jasmine exited the BOM's area of responsibility on 6 February.

In Queensland, Jasmine produced heavy rains and gusty winds. Heavy rainfall from Jasmine's outer rainbands produced large precipitation totals across southern areas of Queensland. After moving into the Coral Sea, a surface trough attached to the system produced more rain showers over Australia. In Cairns, several roads were closed and trees were uprooted by strong winds associated with Jasmine. In addition, power lines that were knocked down in the city's northern suburbs caused power outages for affected areas.

=== Tropical Low 13U (Hilwa) ===
- Tropical low (Australian scale)
- Tropical storm (SSHWS)
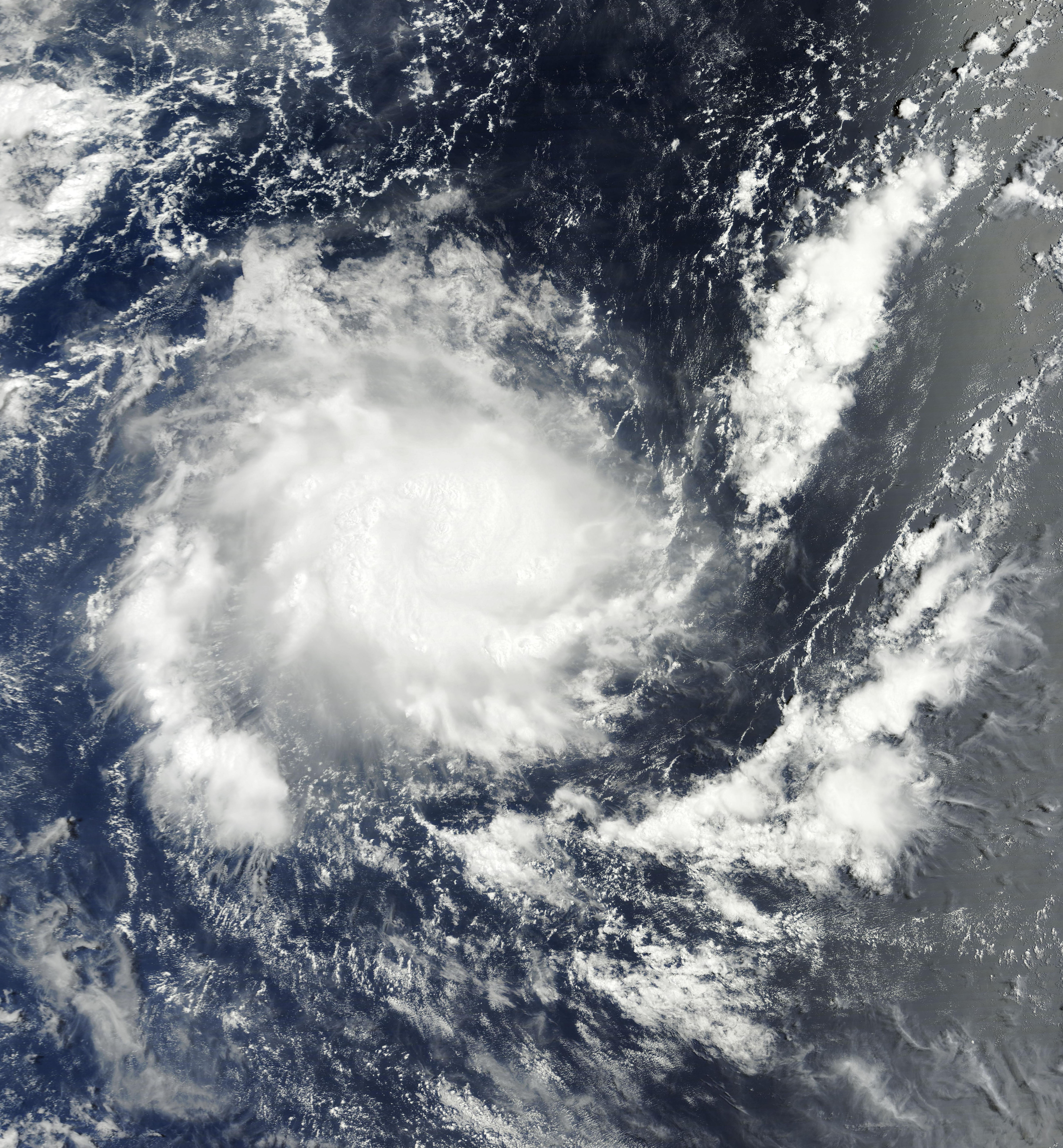
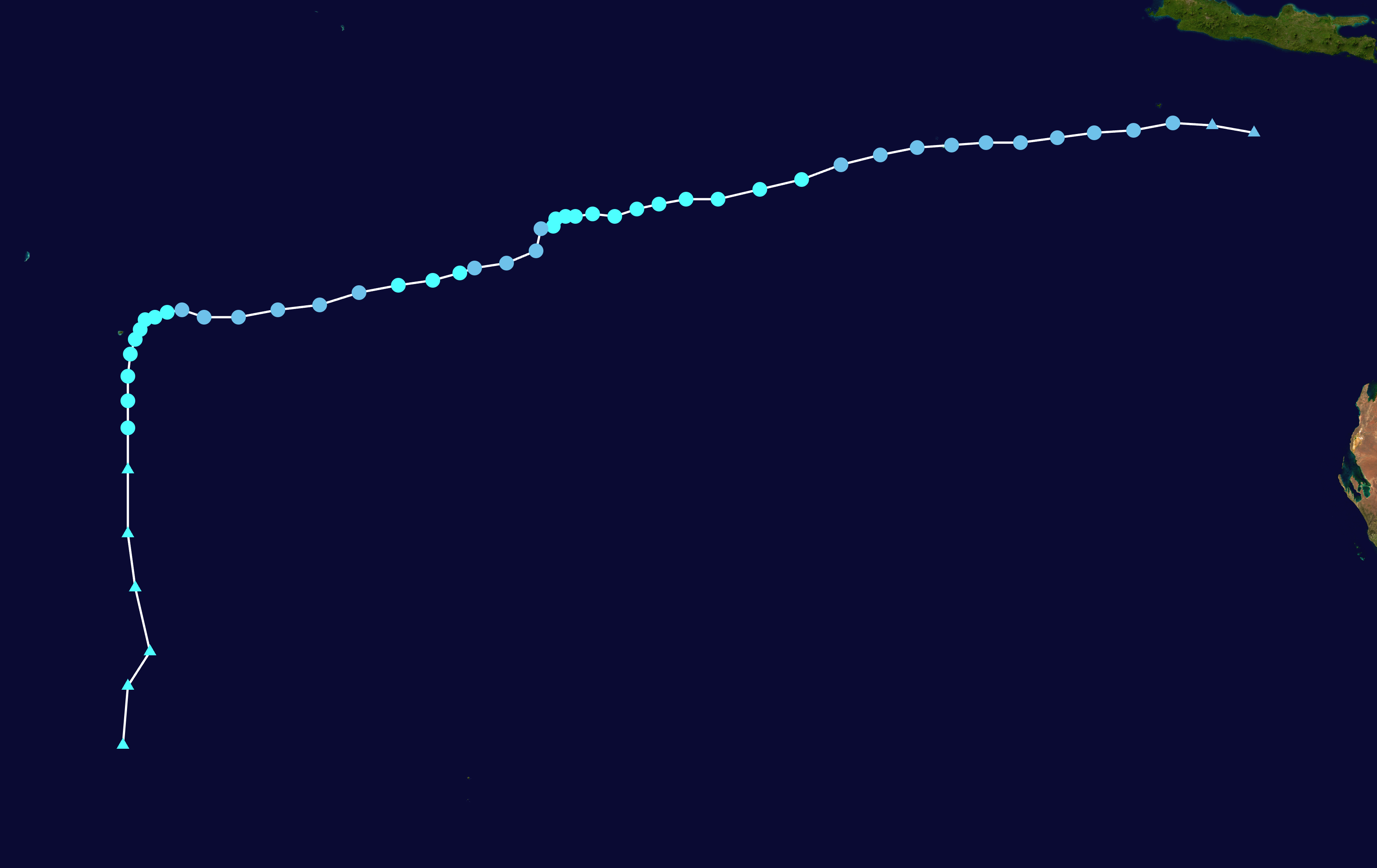
- Duration: 5 February – 14 February (Exited basin)
- Peak intensity: 65 km/h (40 mph) (1-min); 1000 hPa (mbar)

On 5 February, TCWC Perth reported within their tropical weather outlooks that a tropical low was developing near 12°S 95°E, 200 km (120 mi) to the west of the West Island of the Cocos (Keeling) Islands. Over the next few days, TCWC Perth continued to monitor the storm, as it slowly moved westward. TCWC Perth predicted it would move west of 90°E without developing into a Tropical Cyclone. On 14 February, JTWC classified the storm as Tropical Cyclone 13S, as the storm moved out of the BoM's area of responsibility, and into the South-West Indian Ocean basin.

=== Tropical Cyclone Koji–Joni ===
- Category 2 tropical cyclone (Australian scale)
- Tropical storm (SSHWS)
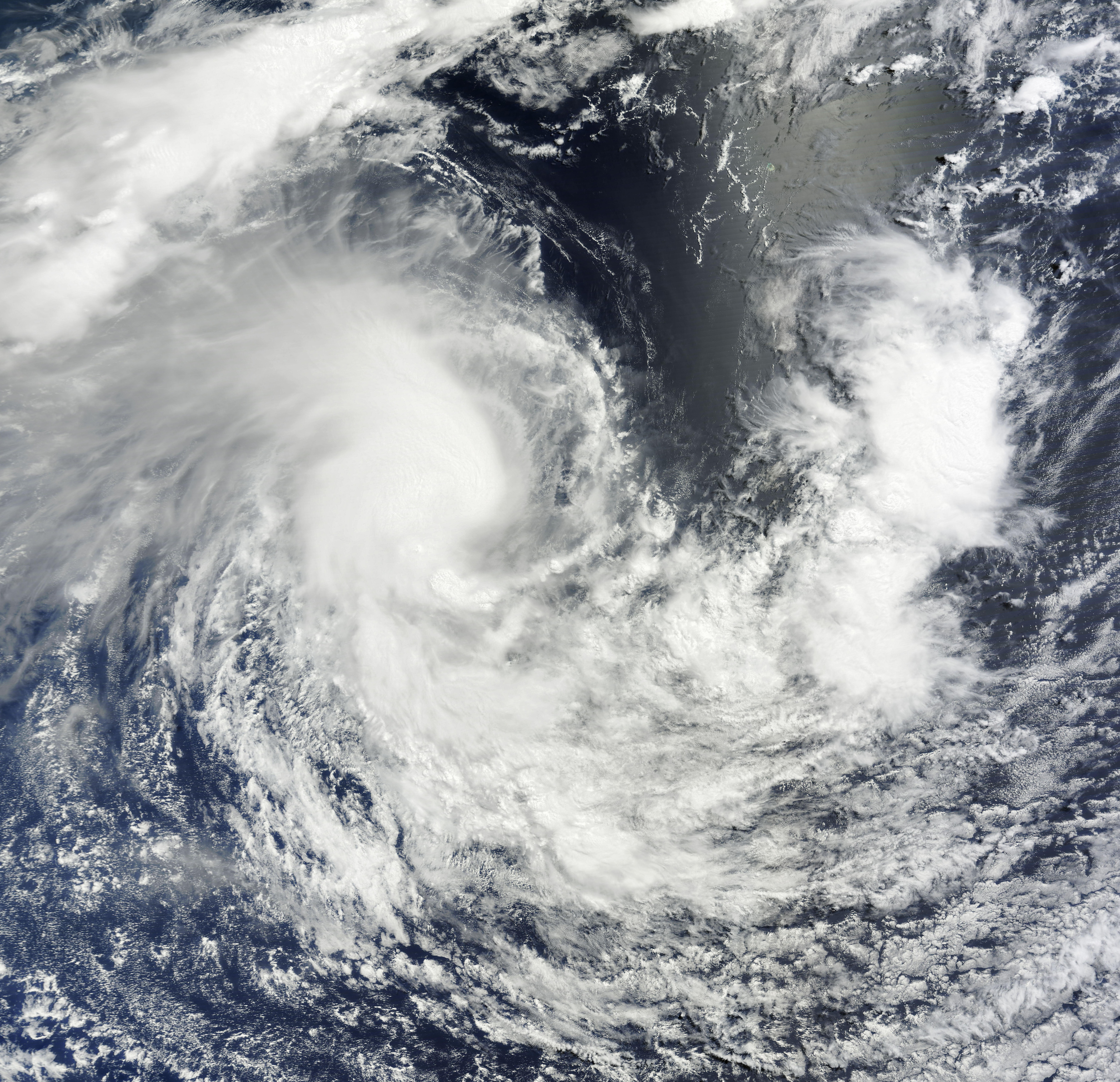
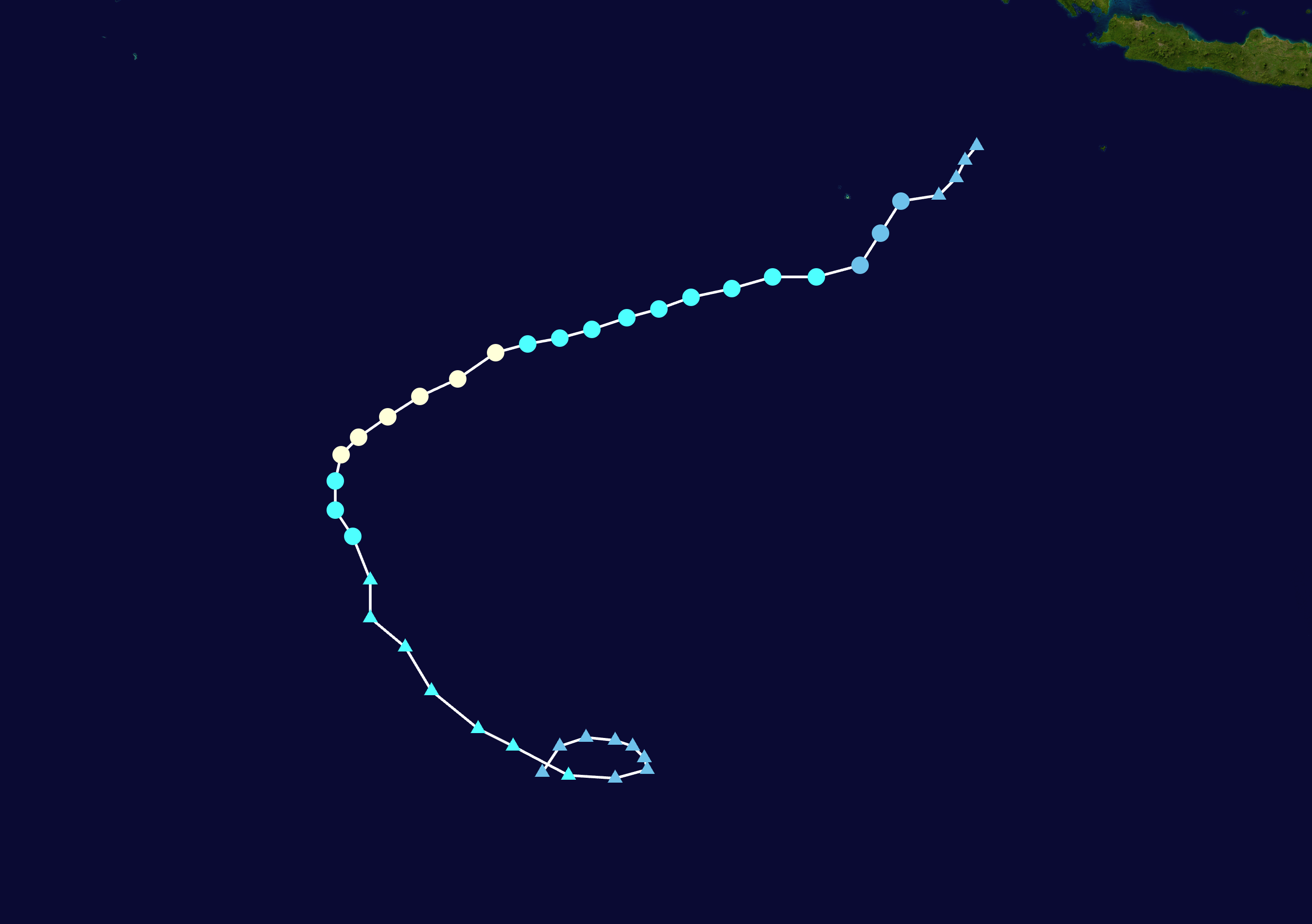
- Duration: 5 March – 8 March (Exited basin)
- Peak intensity: 95 km/h (60 mph) (10-min); 986 hPa (mbar)

On 6 March, an area of thunderstorms that TCWC Perth had been watching since 3 March, became a tropical low. Later on the same day, the BoM designated the storm as Tropical Low 15U while the JTWC designated the storm as Tropical Cyclone 16S. On the morning of 8 March, the low strengthened into a Category 1 tropical cyclone, assigning the name Koji. However, a few hours later, Koji moved west of 90°E and was renamed Joni by the Mauritius Meteorological Service. Despite this, the combined name Koji–Joni was now used on advisories issued on the storm, instead of a "single" name. This would be the last system to be renamed, with Cyclone Bruce in 2013 being the first system to retain its name when it moved west of 90°E.

=== Severe Tropical Cyclone Lua ===
- Category 3 severe tropical cyclone (Australian scale)
- Category 2 tropical cyclone (SSHWS)
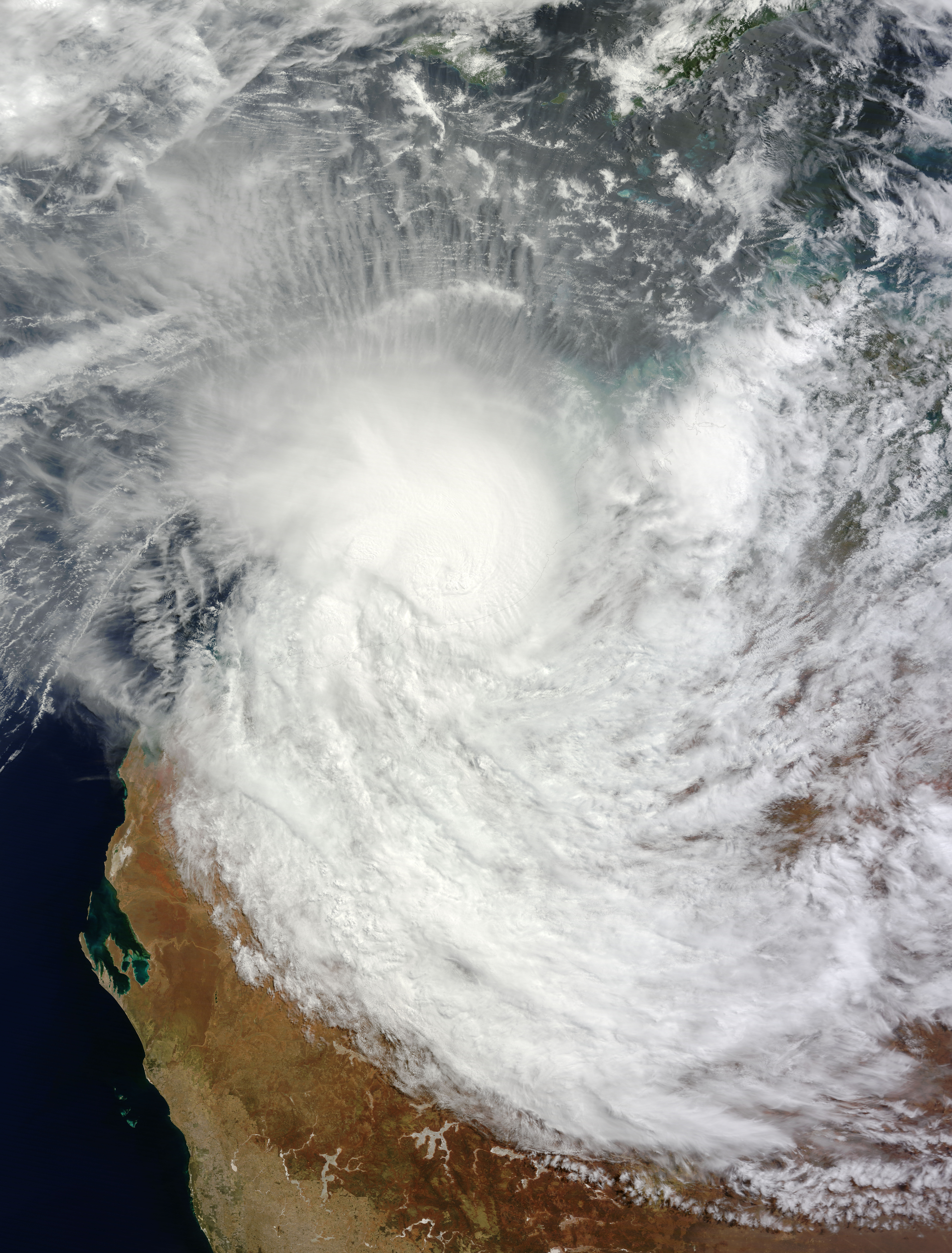
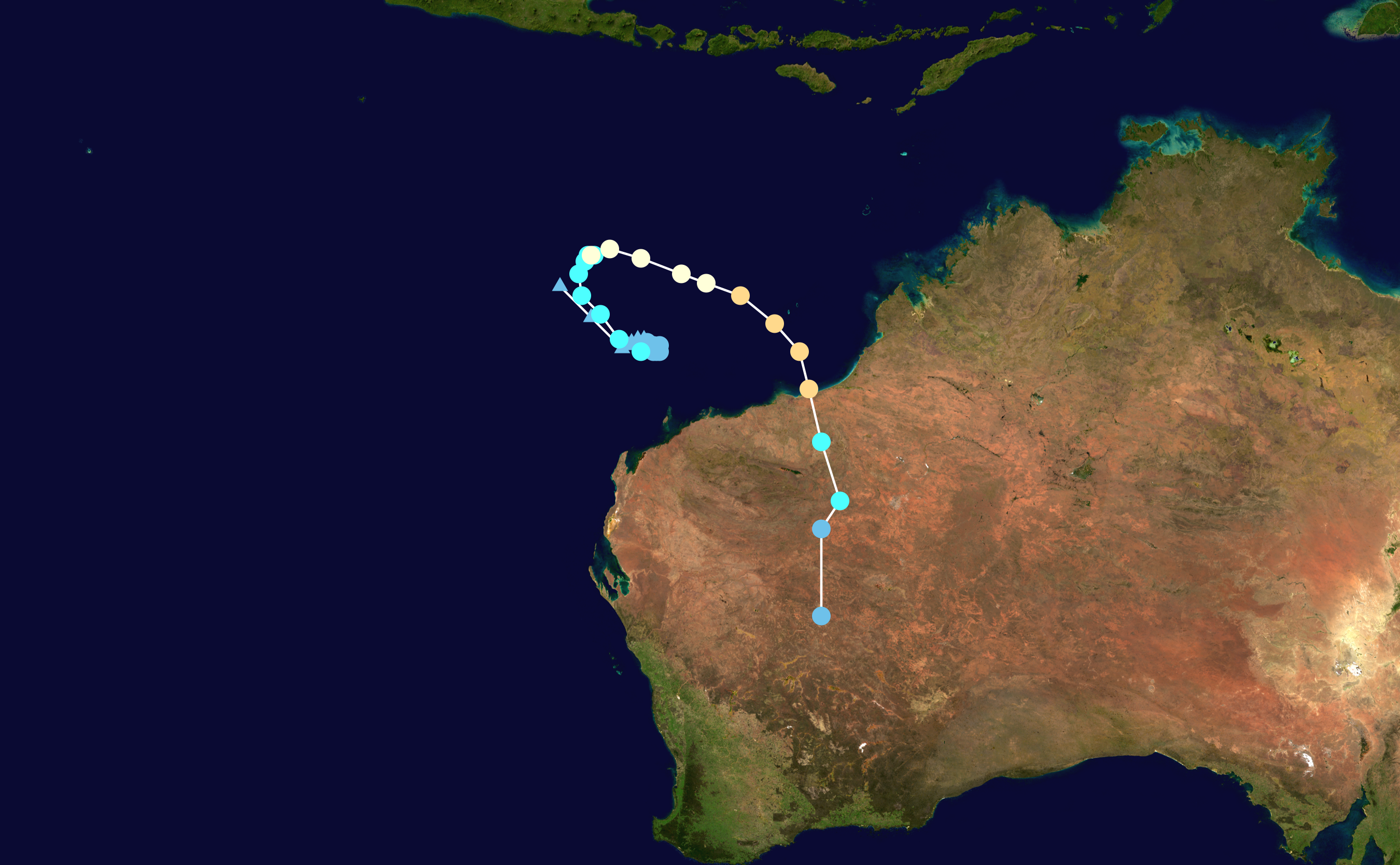
- Duration: 9 March – 18 March
- Peak intensity: 155 km/h (100 mph) (10-min); 935 hPa (mbar)

On 8 March, a low-pressure area developed well off the coast of Pilbara. On 9 March, TCWC Perth noted the low had become a tropical low, and then assigned the identification 16U. On 13 March, both the BoM and the JTWC upgraded the system to a category 1 tropical cyclone and named it Lua. On 14 March, Lua intensified into a category 2 tropical cyclone as it began moving westwards away from Western Australia. Lua became a category 3 severe tropical cyclone on 16 March, and it made landfall near Pardoo the next day, with sustained winds of 155 km/h (95 mph). Early on 18 March, Lua weakened below tropical cyclone intensity. The remnants of the storm dissipated later on that day, after moving deeper into Western Australia.

Lua is so far the strongest cyclone to impact the Australian coast, since Yasi in 2011, and the Pilbara coast, since Laurence in 2009. Lua is also notable for maintaining cyclone strength as far south as Wiluna, making it the closest a cyclone has approached the Goldfields–Esperance region, since Steve in 2000. The city of Kalgoorlie received 59.4 mm of rainfall from the system, its heaviest rainfall in 12 years, while Norseman received 60 mm.

=== Tropical Low 17U ===
- Tropical low (Australian scale)
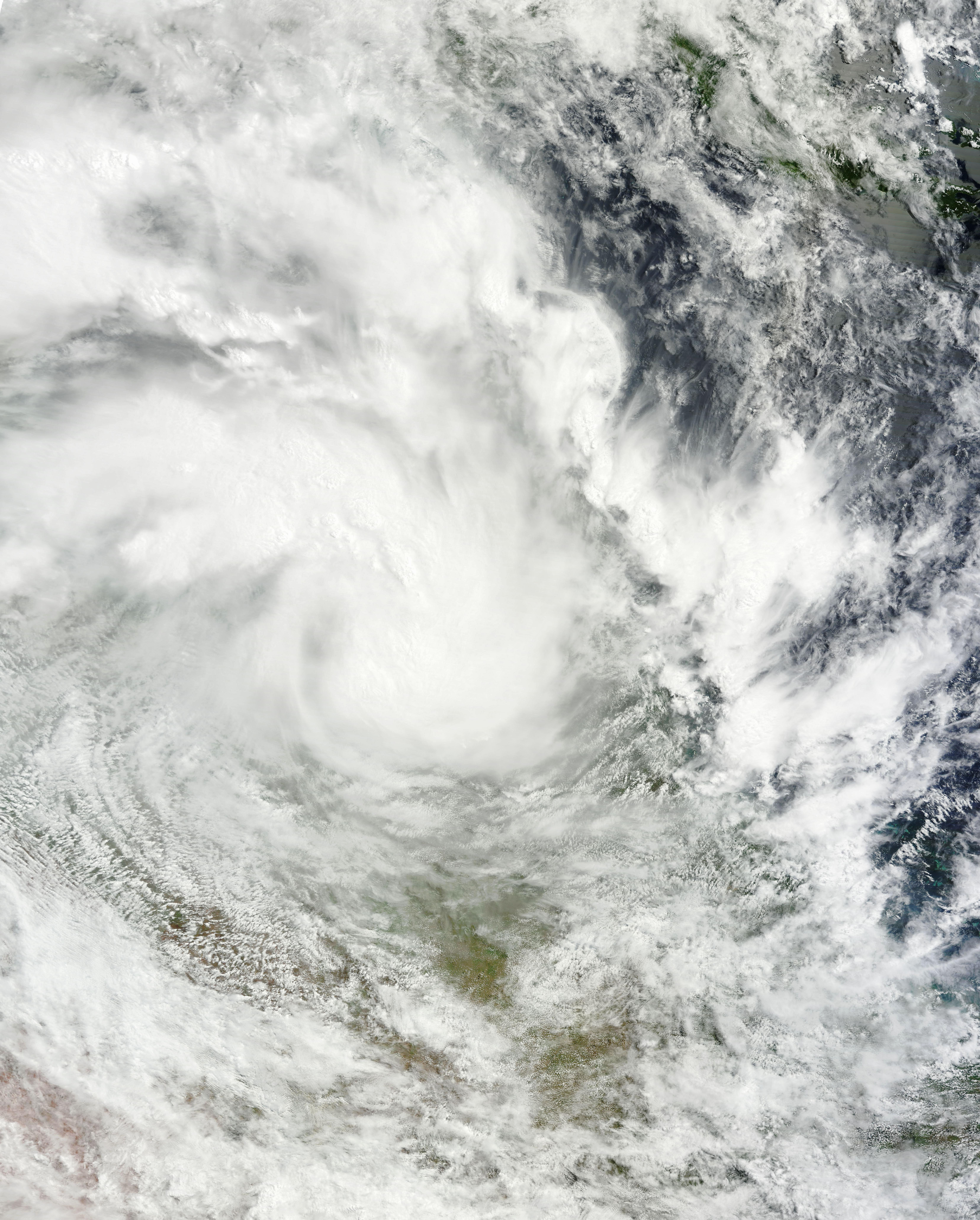
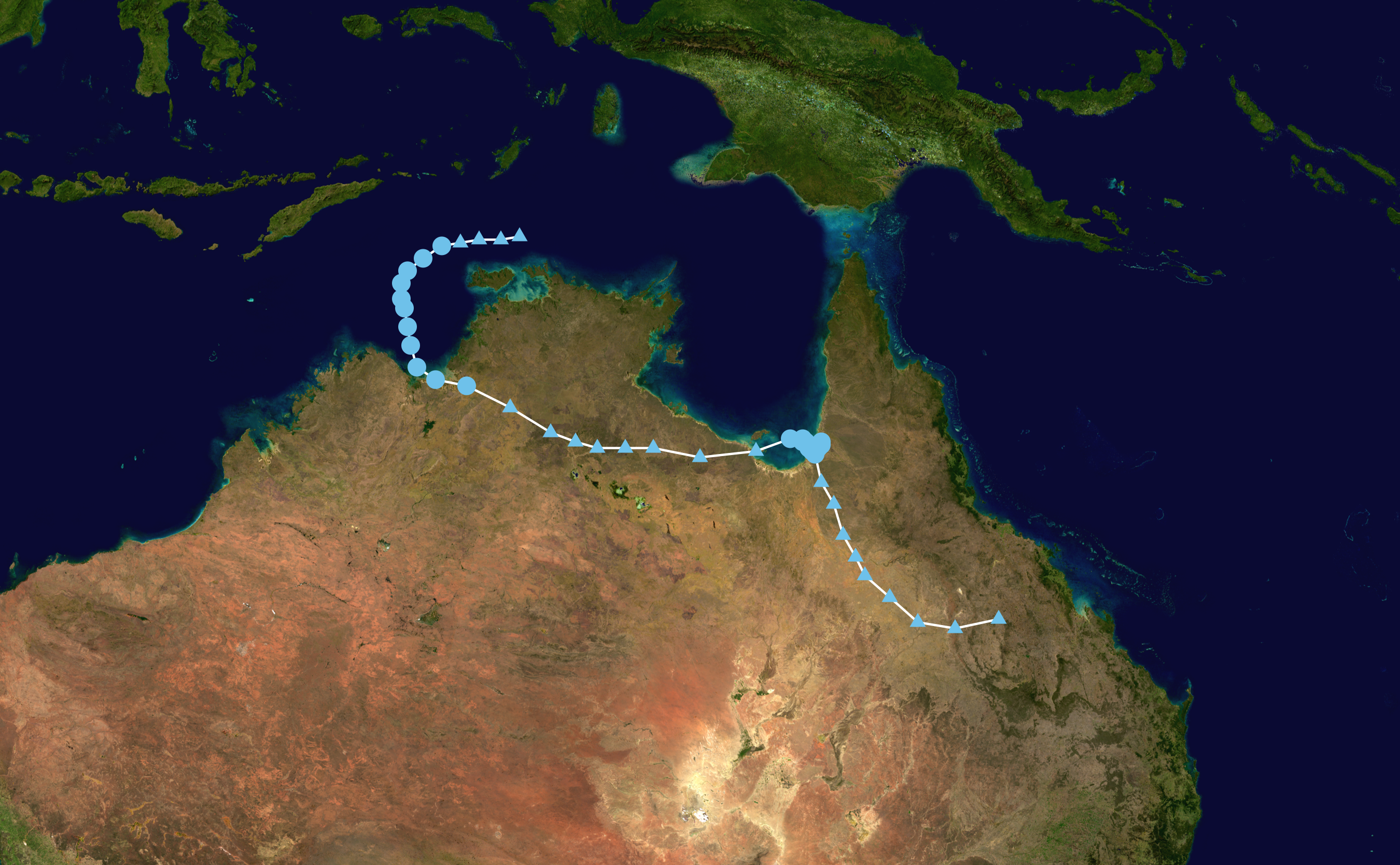
- Duration: 11 March – 21 March
- Peak intensity: 55 km/h (35 mph) (10-min); 993 hPa (mbar)

On 9 March, an area of low pressure developed to the north of Kimberley. Over the next 3 days, the low moved into the Timor Sea, as the storm slowly intensified. On 12 March, TCWC Darwin reported that the storm had intensified into a tropical low and gave it the identification 17U. As the storm approached the northern coast of Western Australia, it continued to intensify slowly. On 14 March, Tropical Low 17U slowly began to weaken as the storm made landfall on the northeastern border of Western Australia. Several hours later, 17U made a second landfall over the northwestern border of the Northern Territory. Afterwards, TCWC Darwin issued their last bulletin on the storm as it degenerated into a weak low. During the next several hours, 17U continued moving eastwards deep into the Northern Territory while maintaining its intensity. However, TCWC Darwin continued to track 17U on their 3-Day Outlook, until the storm entered TCWC Brisbane's area of responsibility, on 16 March. Late on 15 March, 17U crossed over into Northern Queensland with the northern part of the storm emerging into the southern part of the Gulf of Carpentaria. Soon afterwards, 17U began to reintensify. Late on 17 March, 17U began to stall in the southeastern Gulf of Carpentaria. Late on 18 March, TWCW Brisbane issued their last advisory on the storm, as it was not expected to become a tropical cyclone, at this point. However, the agency continued to track the storm on their outlook, until the storm's dissipation. Late on 19 March, Tropical Low 17U began moving southward, deeper into Queensland. Early on 20 March, wind shear began weakening the storm, as it turned eastward. Late on 21 March, 17U began emerging off the eastern coast of Queensland, as it was drawn towards a powerful extratropical cyclone, to the east. By 22 March, the extratropical storm had absorbed Tropical Low 17U, and thus the storm was dropped from TCWC Brisbane's outlook.

=== Tropical Low 18U (Daphne) ===
- Tropical low (Australian scale)
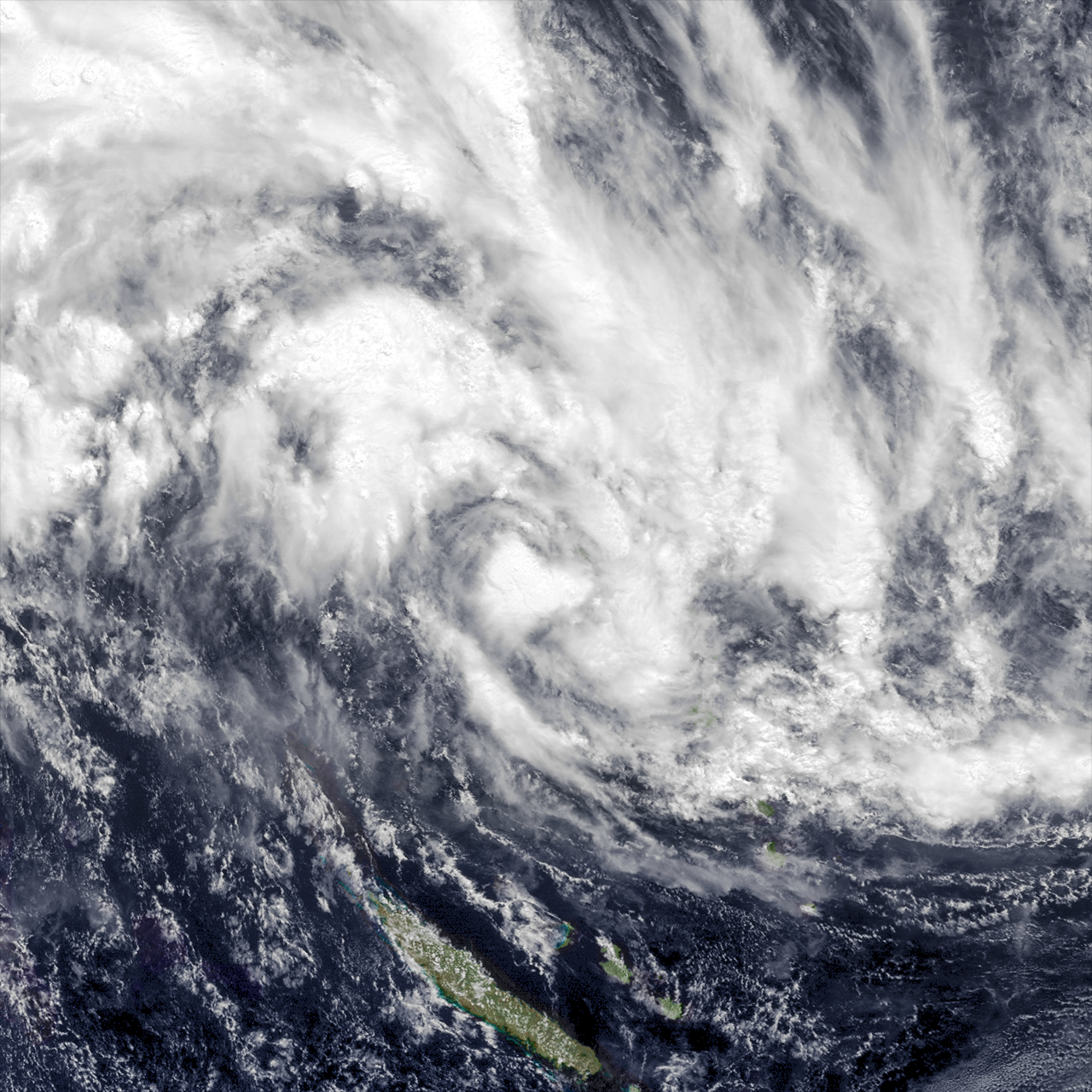
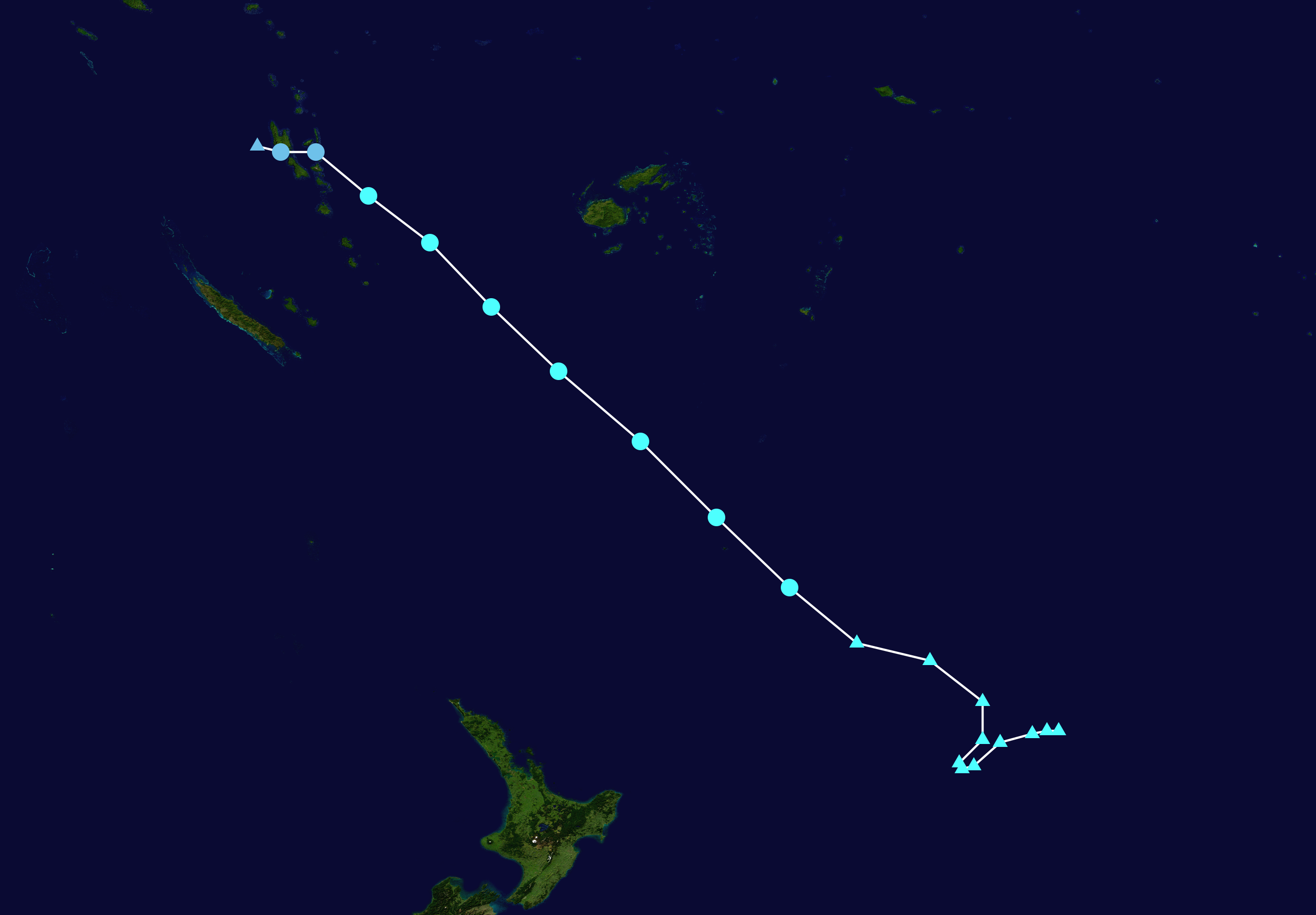
- Duration: 29 March – 31 March (Exited basin)

=== Tropical Low 19U ===
- Tropical low (Australian scale)
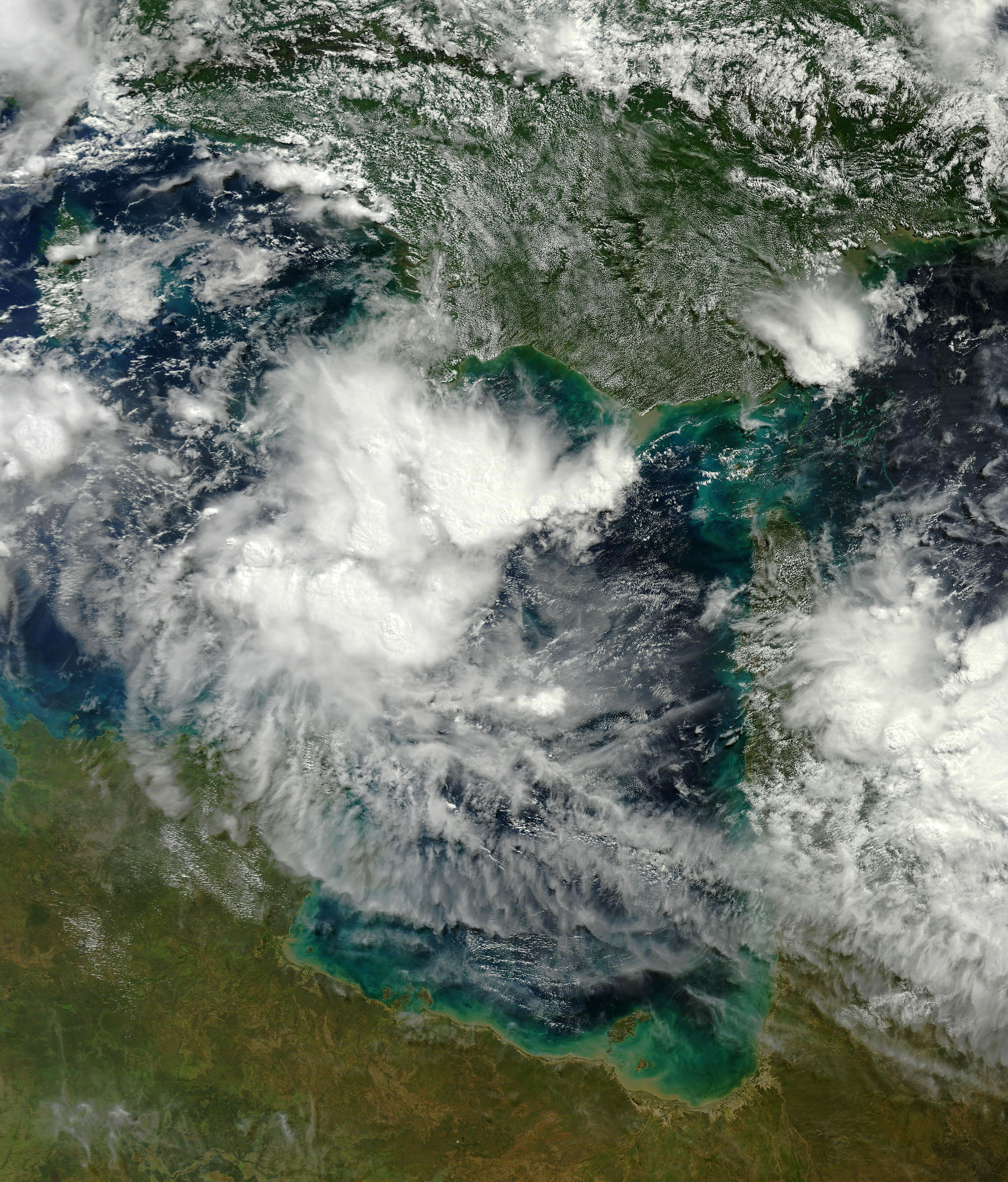
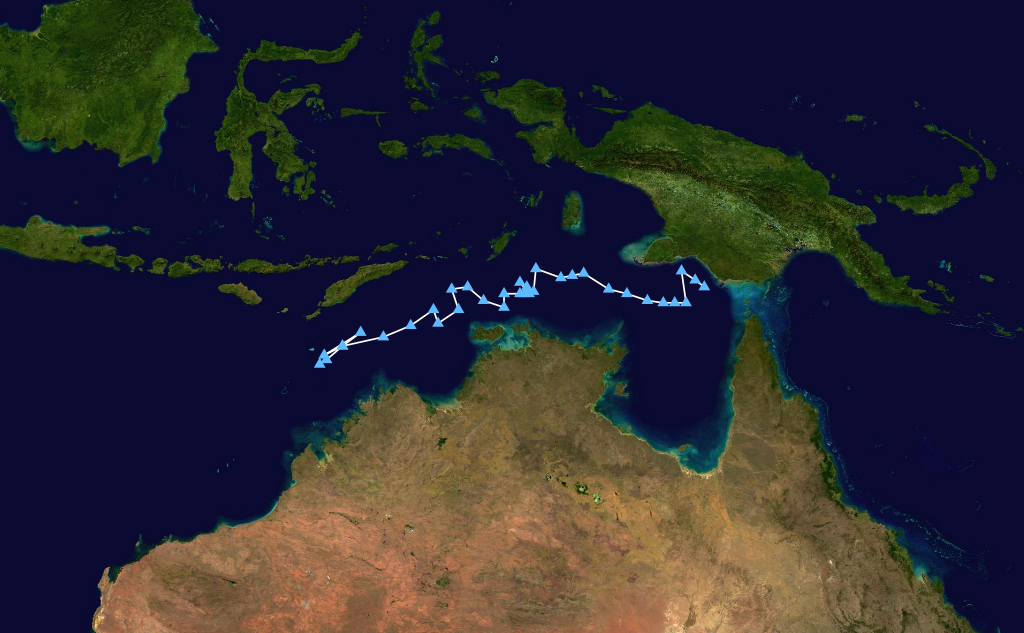
- Duration: 16 April – 23 April
- Peak intensity: Winds not specified; 1006 hPa (mbar)

=== Tropical Depression 19S ===
- Tropical depression (Australian scale)
- Tropical depression (SSHWS)
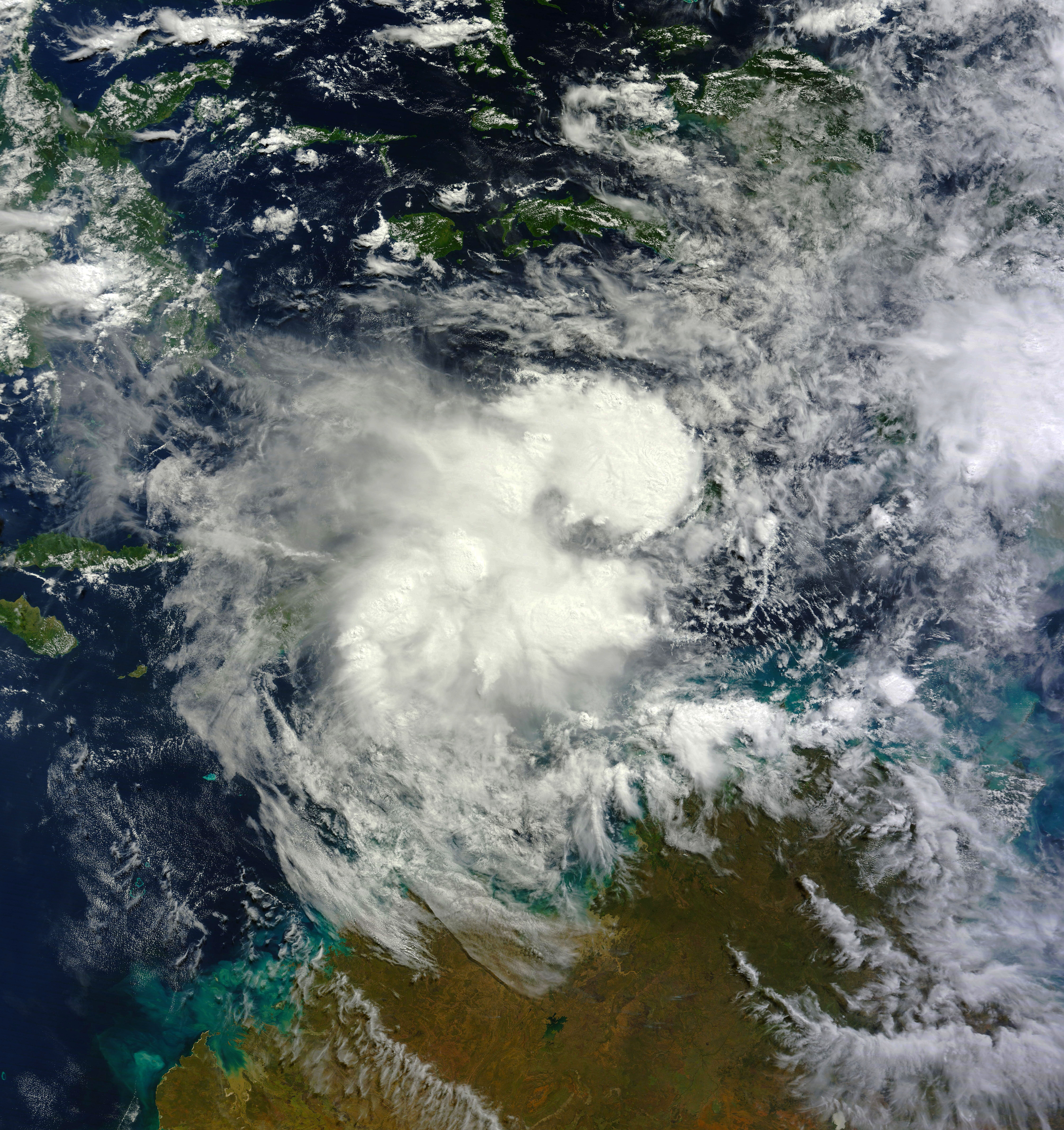
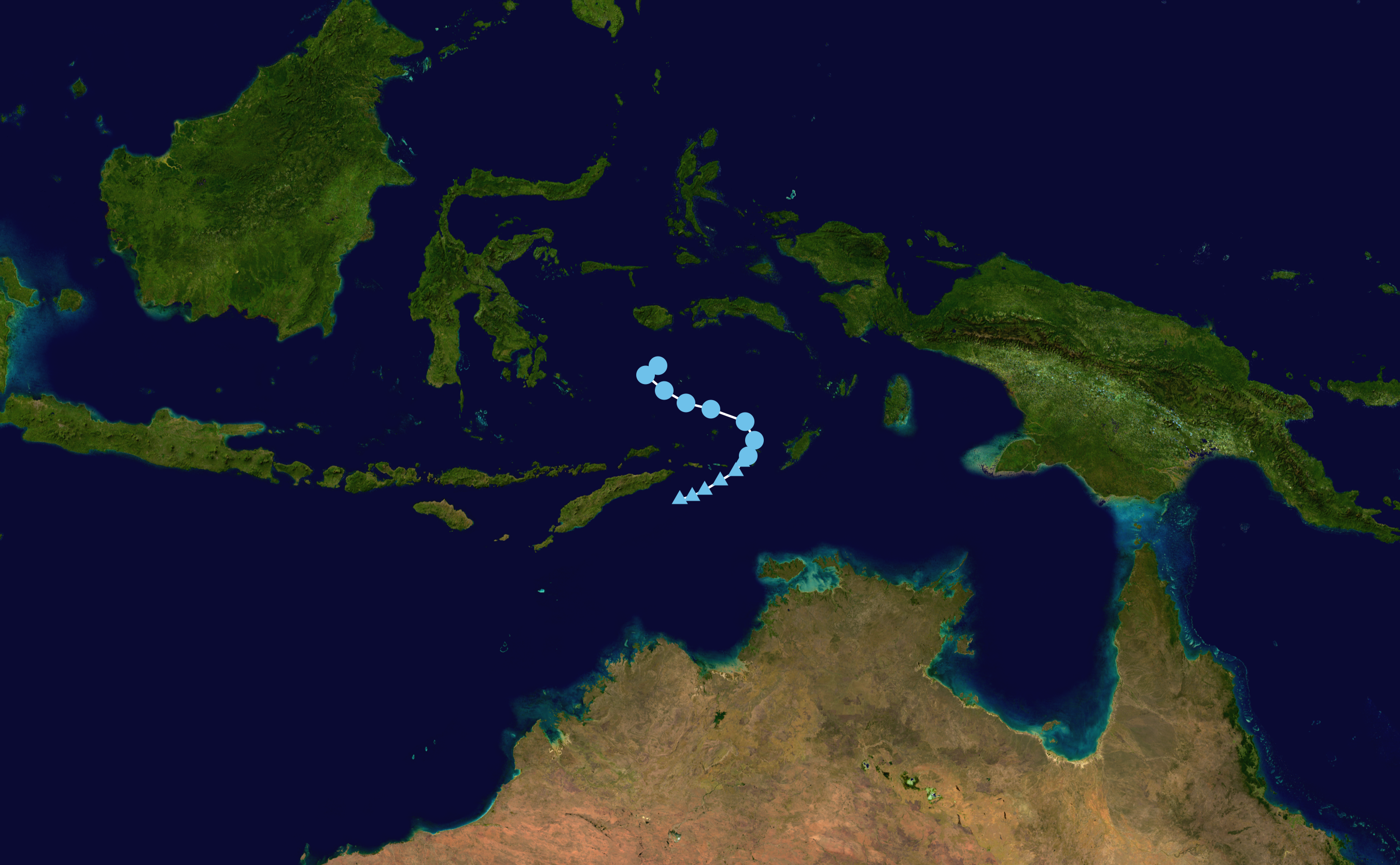
- Duration: 7 May – 14 May
- Peak intensity: 55 km/h (35 mph) (10-min); 996 hPa (mbar)

On 5 May, the JTWC reported that a tropical disturbance had developed within the Banda Sea, about 425 km (265 mi) to the northeast of Dili, on Timor island. On 7 May, TCWC Jakarta and the JTWC reported that the disturbance strengthened into a tropical depression, off the Indonesian east coast, and gave the storm the identifier 19S. Soon afterwards, the storm reached its peak intensity, with a central low pressure of 996 mbars. Late on 7 May, vertical wind shear from the north caused the system's northern convection to dissipate, as the storm turned to the southeast, prompting the JTWC to issue their last advisory on the system. However, on 8 May, the wind shear weakened, and the system regained its convection, as it began to reorganize. Later on the same day, 19S turned to the south-southwest and narrowly passed in between a few Indonesia islands. On 10 May, 19S turned to the southwest, as it approached Timor. On 11 May, Tropical Depression 19S turned westward, as it slightly organized. Early on 11 May, Tropical Depression 19S impacted southwestern Timor and stalled there for 2 days, while beginning to weaken. On 12 May, Tropical Depression 19S began to weaken more rapidly, as it turned to the northwest. Early on 14 May, Tropical Depression 19S passed to the east of Sumba and impacted Flores, as the storm continued to move northwestwards. Later on the same day, TCWC Jakarta and the BoM both issued their last advisories on Tropical Depression 19S, as the storm dissipated just north of Flores.

=== Tropical Cyclone 21U ===
- Category 1 tropical cyclone (Australian scale)
- Tropical storm (SSHWS)
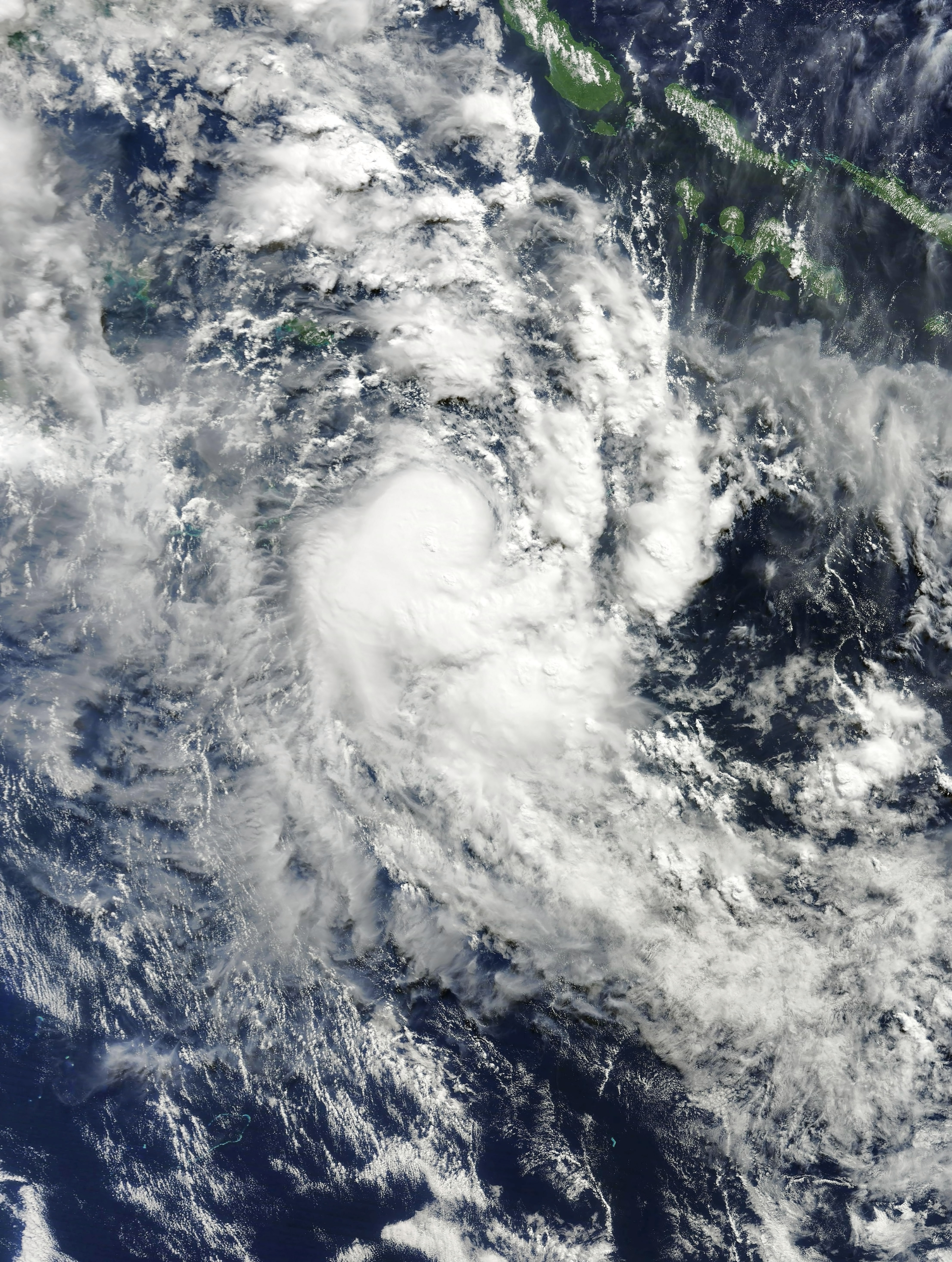
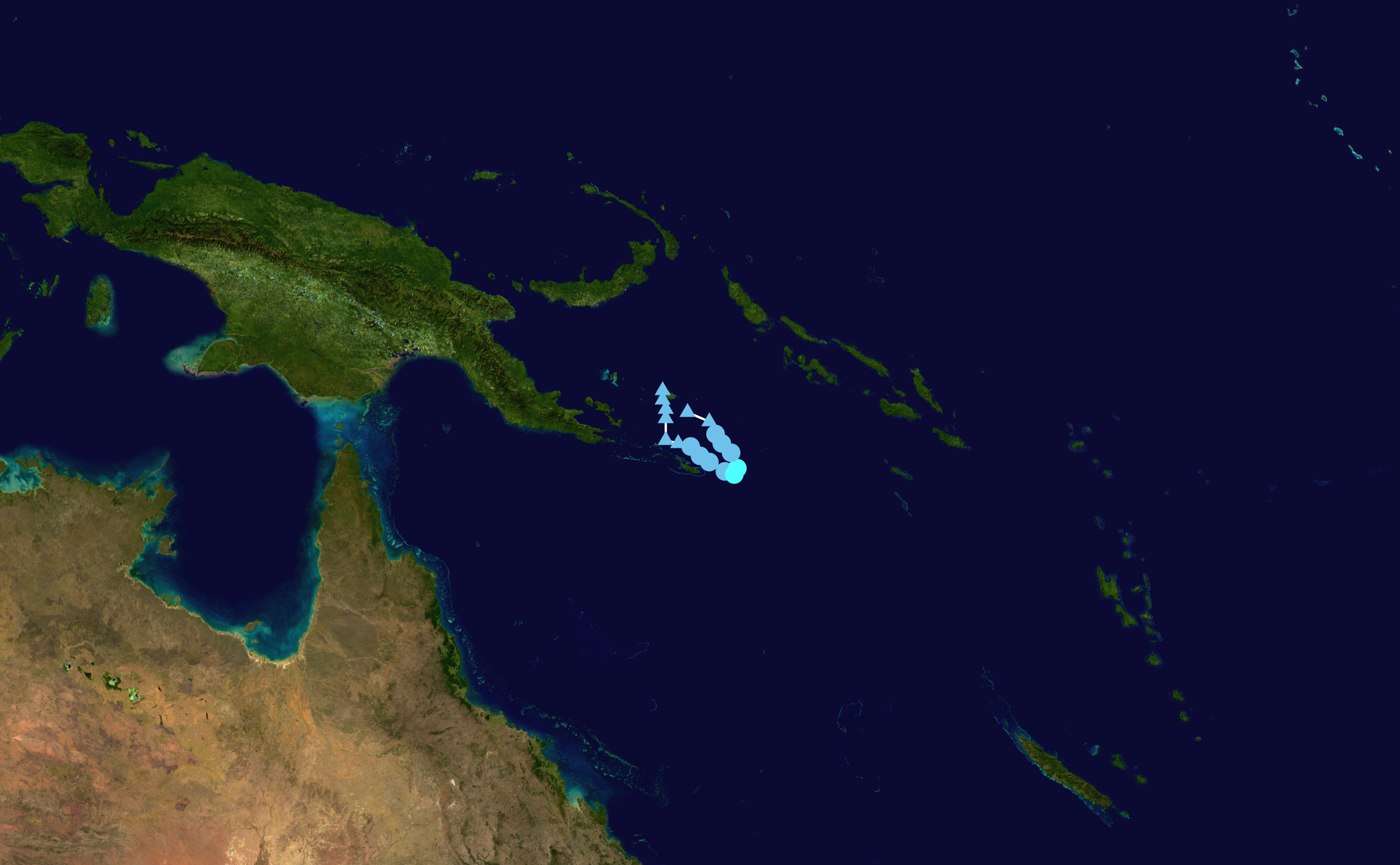
- Duration: 27 June – 1 July
- Peak intensity: 85 km/h (50 mph) (10-min); 993 hPa (mbar)

This system was one of the few storms to form out of season.

=== Other systems ===
On 26 December, TCWC Perth reported that a tropical low had developed near the Western boundary of the region, located over in moderate vertical wind shear. The tropical low slowly moved in a westward direction and the JTWC issued a TCFA; although TCWC Perth issued its final advisory on the tropical low on 28 December. On 5 January, TCWC Darwin had spotted a weak tropical low, formed from the monsoon trough over to the north of Timor, however this was the only known advisory for that system. Two tropical lows also developed during January, but those storms remained extremely weak. On 3 March, TCWC Brisbane had reported a slow-moving low over in the central Coral Sea. The low lingered for a few days and on 6 March, the JTWC upgraded it to a medium chance of becoming a tropical cyclone, and was reported that the low was having some subtropical characteristics. TCWC Brisbane made its final advisory on the low on 7 March, as it became a remnant low.

== Storm names ==
During the season a total of 7 tropical cyclones received a name from BoM, either by TCWC Perth, Darwin, or Brisbane, when the system was judged to have 10-minute sustained windspeeds of 65 km/h (40 mph). There has only been one list that the Bureau of Meteorology have assigned names to tropical cyclones since the 2008–09 season. Tropical cyclones named by the TCWC Jakarta and Port Moresby are rare, with the last named cyclones occurring during 2010 and 2007, respectively.

- Fina
- Grant
- Heidi
- Iggy
- Jasmine
- Koji
- Lua

- Additionally, Alenga entered the Australian region from the South-West Indian Ocean region (west of 90°E) as a tropical cyclone. As the system crossed between basins intact, it retained the name assigned to it by the Mauritius Meteorological Service on behalf of Météo-France La Réunion.

=== Retirement ===
The Bureau of Meteorology retired the names Heidi, Jasmine and Lua, replacing them with Hayley, Jenna and Luana respectively.

== Season effects ==
Name	Dates	Peak intensity			Areas affected	Damage (USD)	Deaths	Ref(s).
Name	Dates	Category	Wind speed	Pressure	Areas affected	Damage (USD)	Deaths	Ref(s).
Alenga	3–11 December	Category 3 severe tropical cyclone	140 km/h (85 mph)	972 hPa (28.70 inHg)	None	None	None	
Fina	20–25 December	Tropical low	85 km/h (55 mph)	990 hPa (29.23 inHg)	Papua New Guinea	None	None	
03U (Benilde)	21–28 December	Tropical low	Not specified	Not specified	None	None	None	
Grant	21 – 29 December 2011	Category 2 tropical cyclone	110 km/h (70 mph)	976 hPa (28.82 inHg)	Northern Territory, Queensland	Unknown	Unknown	
05U	26–28 December	Tropical low	Not specified	Not specified	None	None	None	
06U	5 January	Tropical low	Not specified	Not specified	Timor	None	None	
Heidi	9–13 January	Category 3 severe tropical cyclone	150 km/h (90 mph)	960 hPa (28.35 inHg)	Western Australia	Minor	None	
08U	13 January	Tropical low	Not specified	Not specified	None	None	None	
09U	21 January	Tropical low	Not specified	Not specified	None	None	None	
10U	22–29 January	Tropical low	55 km/h (35 mph)	993 hPa (29.32 inHg)	Northern Territory, Queensland	Minor	None	
Iggy	22 January – 3 February	Category 2 tropical cyclone	100 km/h (65 mph)	974 hPa (28.76 inHg)	Western Australia	None	16	
Jasmine	31 January – 6 February	Category 2 tropical cyclone	110 km/h (70 mph)	976 hPa (28.82 inHg)	Queensland, New Caledonia, Vanuatu, Tonga	Unknown	Unknown	
13U (Hilwa)	5–14 February	Tropical low	Not specified	1,000 hPa (29.53 inHg)	Christmas Island, Cocos Islands	None	None	
14U	3–7 March	Tropical low	Not specified	1,000 hPa (29.53 inHg)	Western Australia	None	None	
Koji-Joni	5–8 March	Category 2 tropical cyclone	95 km/h (60 mph)	985 hPa (29.09 inHg)	None	None	None	
Lua	9–18 March	Category 3 severe tropical cyclone	155 km/h (100 mph)	935 hPa (27.61 inHg)	Western Australia	$230 million	None	
17U	11 – 21 March 2012	Tropical low	55 km/h (35 mph)	993 hPa (29.32 inHg)	Western Australia, Northern Territory, Queensland	None	None	
18U (Daphne)	29–31 March	Tropical low	Not specified	Not specified	None	None	None	
19U	16–25 April	Tropical low	Not specified	1,005 hPa (29.68 inHg)	Papua New Guinea, Northern Territory, Queensland, Indonesia, East Timor	None	None	
19S	7–14 May	Tropical depression	55 km/h (35 mph)	996 hPa (29.41 inHg)	Indonesia, East Timor	None	None	
21U	27 June – 1 July 2012	Category 1 tropical cyclone	85 km/h (50 mph)	994 hPa (29.35 inHg)	Papua New Guinea	Unknown	None	
Season aggregates
21 systems	3 December – 1 July		165 km/h (105 mph)	930 hPa (27.46 inHg)		$230 million	16	

== See also ==
- Tropical cyclones in 2011 and 2012
- Australian region tropical cyclone
- List of Southern Hemisphere tropical cyclone seasons
- Atlantic hurricane seasons: 2011, 2012
- Pacific hurricane seasons: 2011, 2012
- Pacific typhoon seasons: 2011, 2012
- North Indian Ocean cyclone seasons: 2011, 2012
- 2011–12 South-West Indian Ocean cyclone season
- 2011–12 South Pacific cyclone season
