= 2011–12 Southern Hemisphere tropical cyclone season =

The 2011–12 Southern Hemisphere tropical cyclone season may refer to one of three different basins and respective seasons:

- 2011–12 South-West Indian Ocean cyclone season, west of 90°E
- 2011–12 Australian region cyclone season, between 90°E and 160°E
- 2011–12 South Pacific cyclone season, east of 160°E

A South Atlantic tropical cyclone formed during this time period, Subtropical Storm Arani
