= Cyclone Jasmine =

Category 4 South Pacific and Australian region cyclone in 2012

Severe Tropical Cyclone Jasmine
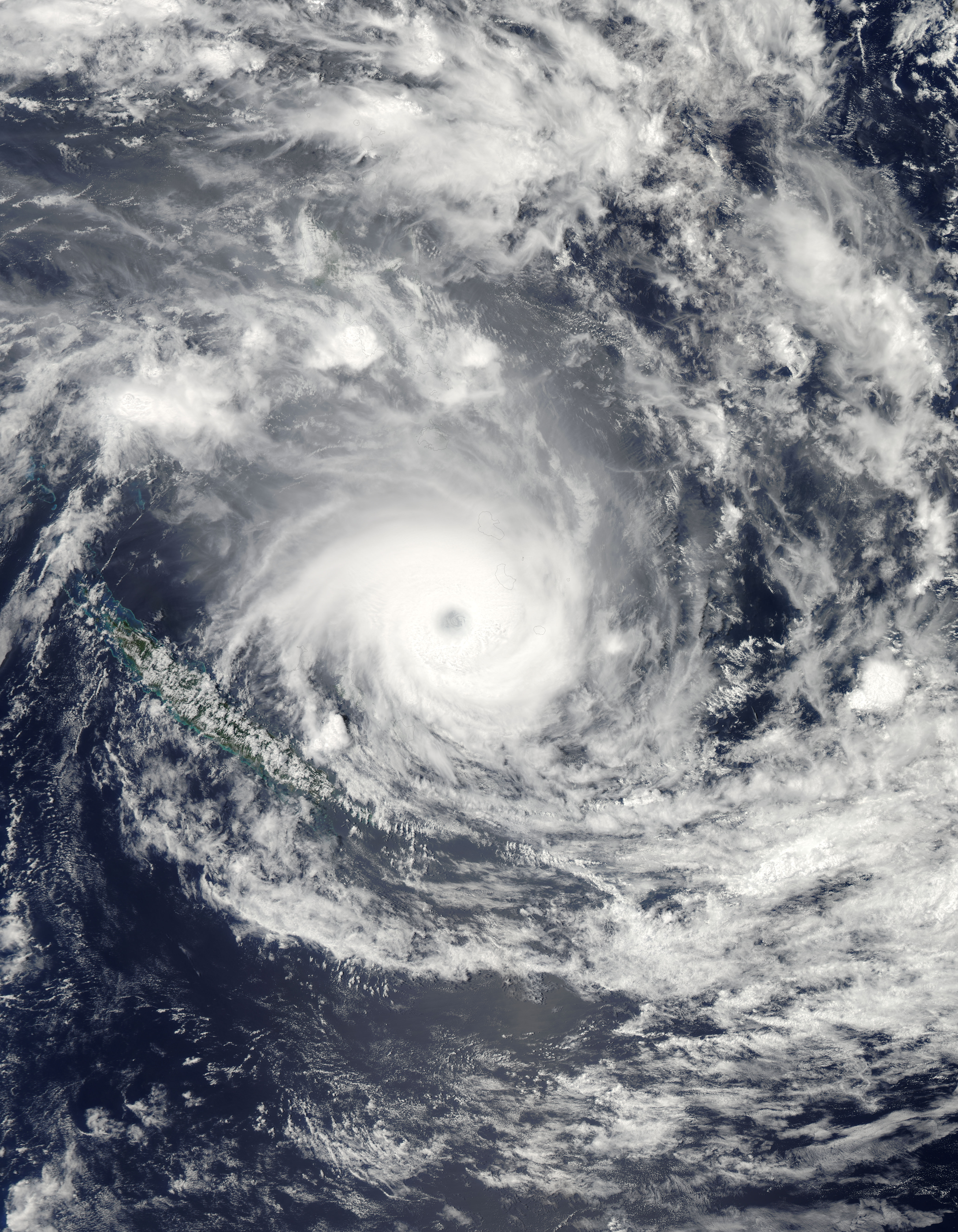
- Cyclone Jasmine near peak intensity on 8 February.

Meteorological history
- Formed: 1 February 2012
- Dissipated: 16 February 2012

Category 4 severe tropical cyclone
- 10-minute sustained (FMS)
- Highest winds: 195 km/h (120 mph)
- Lowest pressure: 937 hPa (mbar); 27.67 inHg

Category 4-equivalent tropical cyclone
- 1-minute sustained (SSHWS/JTWC)
- Highest winds: 215 km/h (130 mph)
- Lowest pressure: 937 hPa (mbar); 27.67 inHg

Overall effects
- Fatalities: None
- Areas affected: Cape York Peninsula, Solomon Islands, Vanuatu, New Caledonia, Tonga
- IBTrACS
- Part of the 2011–12 Australian region and the South Pacific cyclone seasons

Severe Tropical Cyclone Jasmine (RSMC Nadi designation: 12F, JTWC designation: 10P) was a powerful and long-lived annular tropical cyclone that affected several countries, particularly Vanuatu and Tonga, over a 16-day span in February 2012. The system was the second cyclone and the only severe tropical cyclone of the relatively quiet 2011–12 South Pacific cyclone season. Cyclone Jasmine developed from an area of disturbed weather on 1 February in the Gulf of Carpentaria. Initially, the storm moved towards the east and across the Cape York Peninsula. As it moved across the South Pacific, earlier existing wind shear conditions lessened, and Jasmine began to strengthen at a faster rate. Steadily intensifying, Jasmine reached peak intensity on 8 February as a Category 4 equivalent on the Saffir–Simpson Hurricane Scale, while beginning to show annular characteristics.

The next day Jasmine entered an area of vertical wind shear, which consequently weakened the cyclone and caused its eye to expand. A high-pressure area south of Jasmine later steered the weakening cyclone to the northeast on 12 February. Although it entered an area of warmer sea surface temperatures, Jasmine subsequently entered extratropical transition and later degenerated into a remnant low on 16 February, and later dissipated completely on 19 February.

Cyclone Jasmine affected five countries during its existence. The predecessor to Jasmine brought heavy rainfall to areas of extreme northern Queensland. Jasmine also brought rainfall to areas of the Solomon Islands. As a result, pest infestations occurred across the region. In Vanuatu, heavy rains and wind from Jasmine destroy numerous crops. Banana trees in particular are affected by the cyclone. Jasmine inundated areas of Tonga that had already been affected by Cyclone Cyril just a week prior. Nuku'alofa recorded half of its average monthly rainfall in a 24‑hour span due to rains associated with the cyclone. After the season, the name Jasmine was retired from the Australian list of tropical cyclone names.

== Meteorological history ==
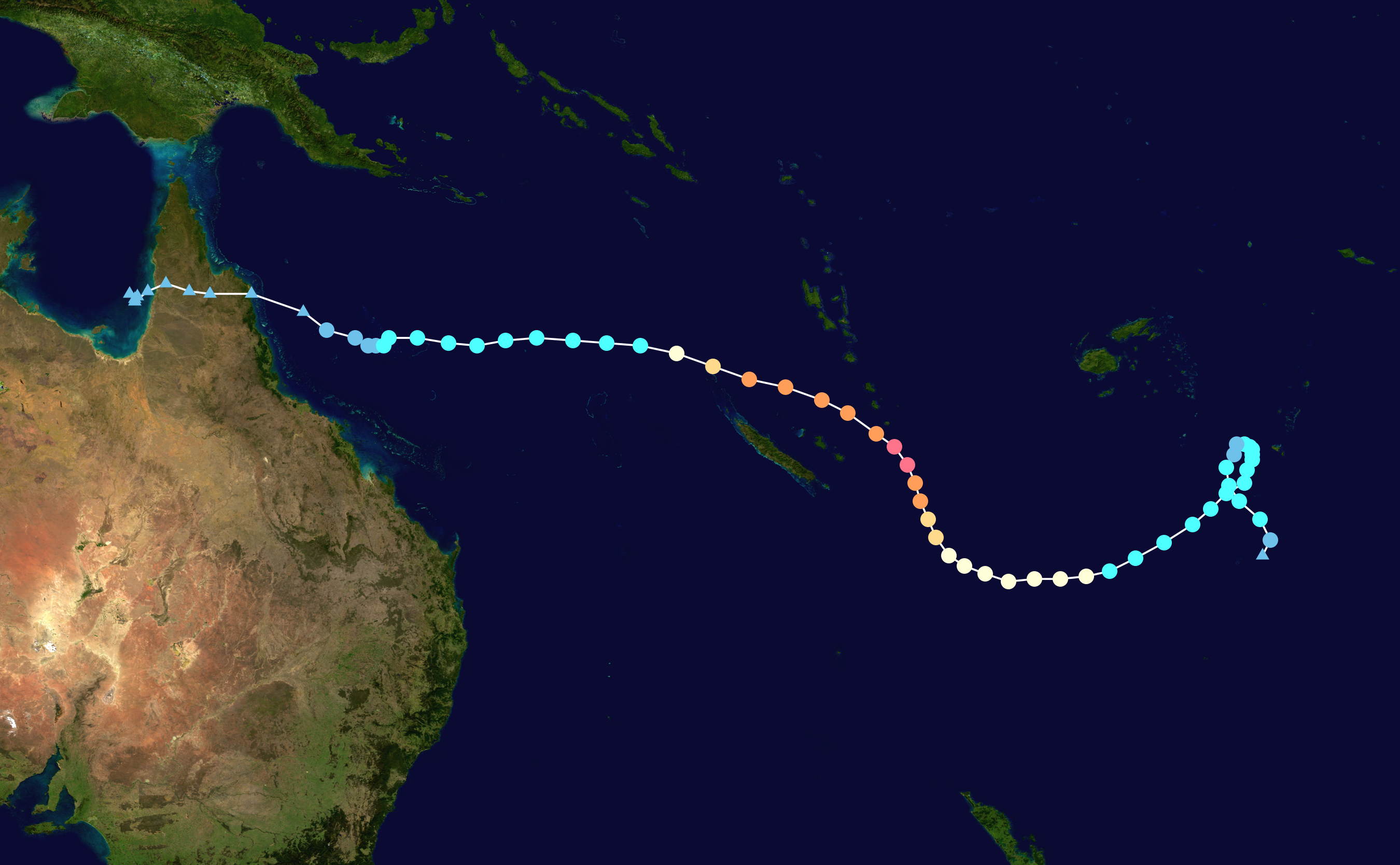
Map plotting the storm's track and intensity, according to the Saffir–Simpson scale Map key Saffir–Simpson scale Tropical depression (≤38 mph, ≤62 km/h) Tropical storm (39–73 mph, 63–118 km/h) Category 1 (74–95 mph, 119–153 km/h) Category 2 (96–110 mph, 154–177 km/h) Category 3 (111–129 mph, 178–208 km/h) Category 4 (130–156 mph, 209–251 km/h) Category 5 (≥157 mph, ≥252 km/h) Unknown Storm type Tropical cyclone Subtropical cyclone Extratropical cyclone, remnant low, tropical disturbance, or monsoon depression

During 31 January the Australian Bureau of Meteorology started to monitor a tropical low, that had developed within the monsoon trough over the western Cape York Peninsula. Over the next day the system moved into the southeastern part of the Gulf of Carpentaria, before it moved back over the Cape York Peninsula during 2 February. The system subsequently emerged into the Coral Sea to the north of Cairns later that day, where a strong northwest monsoon flow with gales developed to the north of the low. The system subsequently moved eastwards and intensified into a category 1 tropical cyclone on the Australian tropical cyclone intensity scale.

On 1 February, the Australian Bureau of Meteorology's Brisbane tropical cyclone warning centre (TCWC Brisbane) and the United States Joint Typhoon Warning Center (JTWC) began to monitor a tropical low that had developed within a monsoon trough about 135 km (85 mi) to the north of Mornington Island. Over the next two days the low moved eastwards and passed over the Cape York Peninsula before it emerged into the Coral Sea to the north of Cairns. After emerging into the Coral Sea the low continued to develop, and on 4 February, the JTWC and TCWC Brisbane reported that the system had become a tropical cyclone with the latter naming it as Jasmine while it was located about 420 km (260 mi) to the east of Cairns.

Tracking eastward, Jasmine entered a flow of dry air, which prevented the storm from strengthening quickly at the time. On 5 February, the low–level atmospheric circulation center of Jasmine became exposed due to the presence of strong vertical wind shear. However, the cyclone was able to maintain its intensity due to the existence of an area of moisture over Australia. Throughout the rest of the day, the wind shear subdued, and the system began to organize as convective banding wrapped around the center. As a result, Cyclone Jasmine intensified into the equivalent of a Category 2 on the Australian tropical cyclone intensity scale, with winds of 95 km/h (59 mph), sustained for 10 minutes. The next day, Cyclone Jasmine began to track to the east-southeast in response to a strengthening subtropical ridge. The cyclone continued to steadily intensify as convection continued to wrap tightly around the center of Jasmine. At the same time, the storm moved out of the BOM's area of responsibility and into the area of responsibility of the Fiji Meteorological Service's (FMS) tropical cyclone warning center at Nadi, Fiji (RSMC Nadi).

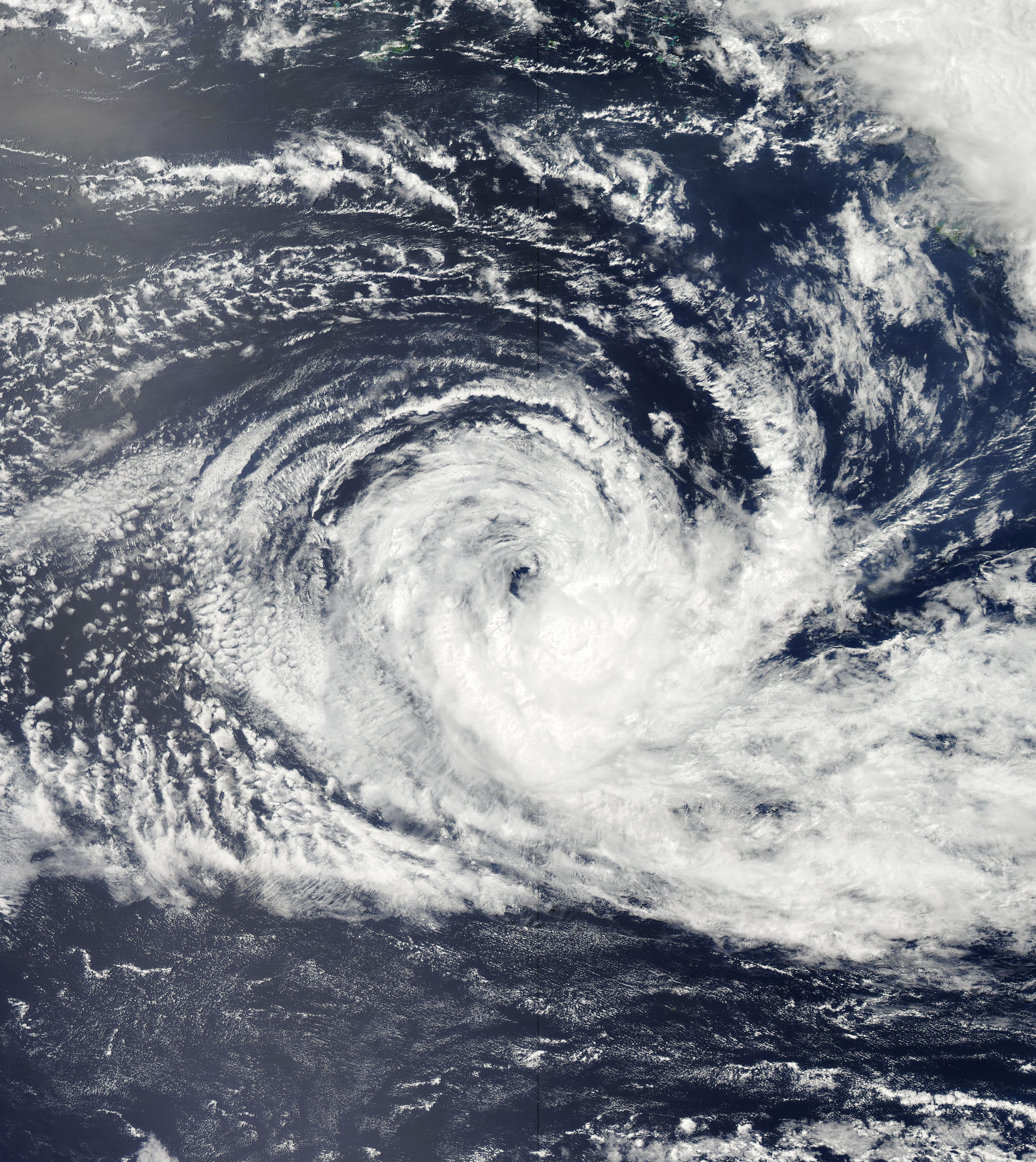
Cyclone Jasmine on 12 February

Late on 7 February, while still tracking to the east-southeast, Jasmine rapidly intensified, with wind speeds increasing to 185 km/h (115 mph), sustained for one minute. The cyclone developed a ragged eye stretching 40 km (25 mi) across. Later that day, Jasmine reached its peak intensity as it passed 280 km (170 mi) to the northeast of New Caledonia, with wind speeds of 215 km/h (134 mph), equivalent to a Category 4 cyclone on both the Australian and Saffir-Simpson hurricane scales (SSHS). Throughout 8 February, Jasmine began to show characteristics of an annular hurricane, maintaining a large, asymmetric eye and rather shallow convective features. In addition, multiple eyewall mesovortices developed within the eye.

However, Jasmine did not maintain its peak intensity for an extended period of time. By 9 February, the cloud tops surrounding Jasmine began to warm, and thus weakened. In addition, the cyclone began to enter cooler SSTs. Although Jasmine's convective bands continued to thin out, the cyclone maintained a gradually expanding eyewall and remained a compact system. By 10 February, the eyewall of Cyclone Jasmine measured 95 km (59 mi) in diameter. The next day, the subtropical ridge that had been forcing Jasmine toward the southeast had weakened, and as a result the cyclone began to track east-northeast, toward a weakness in the ridge. The storm continued to disorganize, with its eye later becoming cloud–filled. By the end of 11 February, Jasmine had already weakened to a cyclone with wind speeds of just 85 km/h (53 mph), sustained for one minute, due to the presence of strong vertical wind shear. The low–level circulation center of Jasmine became partly exposed for a period of time on 12 February, before convection redeveloped over the center. As a weakening cyclone, Jasmine only maintained an area of weak convection displaced to its east as it approached Tonga.

On 13 February, convection re-developed and later strengthened over Jasmine's center of circulation due to the presence of the South Pacific convergence zone and warm SSTs. Cyclone Jasmine was able to attain a secondary peak intensity of 85 km/h (53 mph), sustained for one minute, as the system's banding features became better defined. Due to Jasmine's position between two anticyclones, the cyclone erratically moved in a loop in the vicinity of Tonga from 14 to 15 February, before moving to the southeast. The system later exited the favorable conditions and moved into an area of strong wind shear once again. Convection became sheared apart and Jasmine's center of circulation once again became ill-defined and exposed. Late on 15 February, the JTWC issued their last advisory on the system, and on the next day, RSMC Nadi reported that Cyclone Jasmine had degenerated into an extratropical cyclone.

== Preparations and impact ==
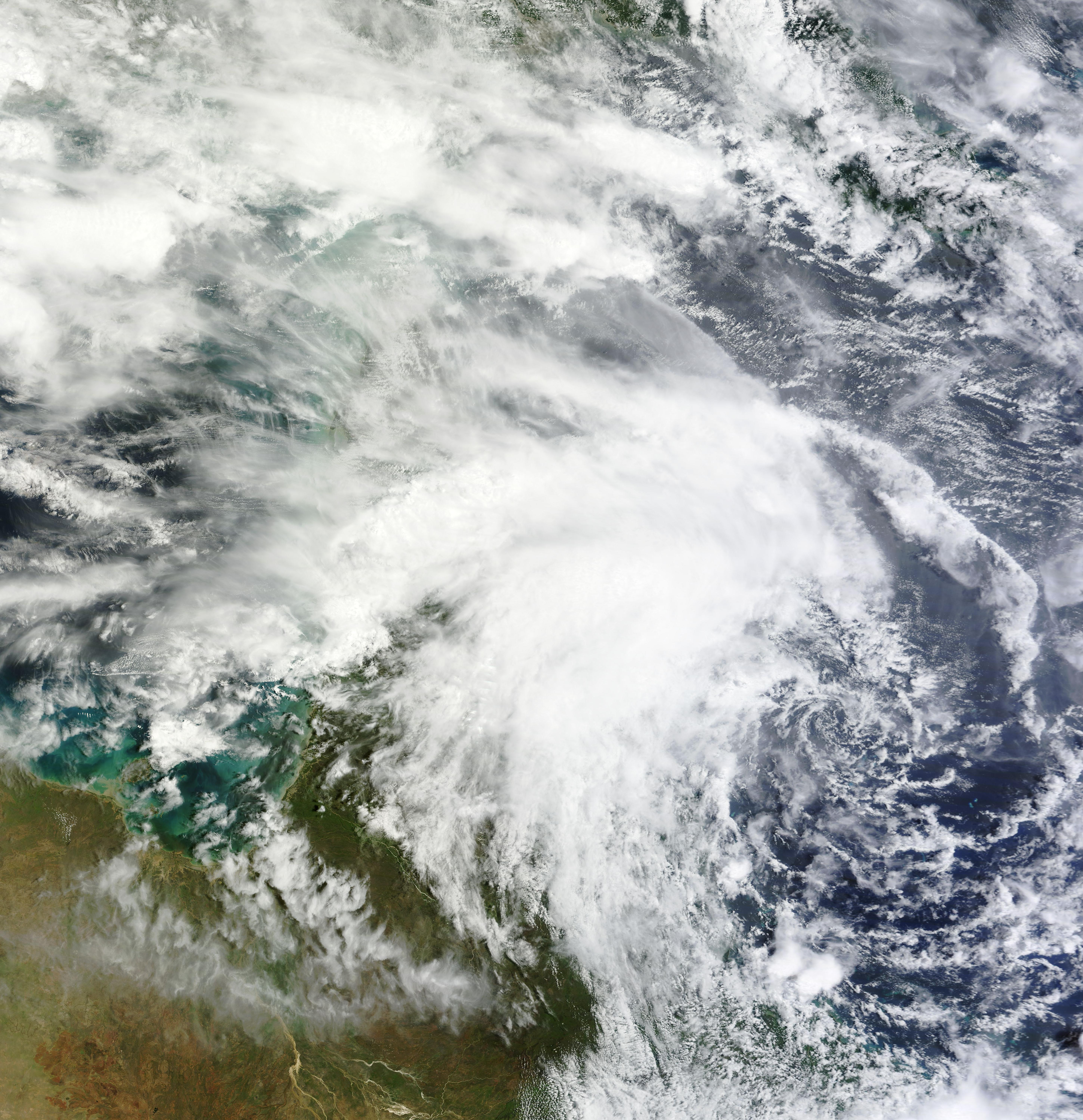
Cyclone Jasmine crossing the Cape York Peninsula on 3 February.

During its existence, parts of Queensland, the Solomon Islands, Vanuatu, New Caledonia, Fiji and Tonga were affected by Cyclone Jasmine. The name Jasmine was retired from the Australian list of tropical cyclone names after the season by the World Meteorological Organization, and was replaced by the name Jenna.

=== Queensland ===
Early in its existence, Jasmine produced numerous rain showers over northern areas of Queensland. Gusty winds in Weipa, Queensland from Jasmine damaged trees on 2 February. A strong rainband associated with the cyclone produced heavy rainfalls over southern parts of Queensland. After Jasmine entered the Coral Sea, a surface trough extending from the cyclone produced rainfall over coastal areas of eastern Australia. In Cairns, Queensland, several roads were closed due to severe weather associated with the cyclone, and trees were uprooted by strong winds. Power lines in the northern suburbs of Cairns were also damaged due to strong winds. Other areas of Queensland recorded rain totals in excess of 100 mm (3.9 in).

=== Vanuatu ===
Prior to Cyclone Jasmine, the Vanuatu National Disaster Management Office was preparing for the cyclone after the storm was forecast to impact the country. The aid agency Oxfam prepared for food and water shortages, using the previous year's severe weather to gauge potential impacts from Cyclone Jasmine. The Save the Children Fund prepared materials prior to the cyclone that could supply area schools with materials, known as a "school-in-a-box." People in affected areas were evacuated to care centers prior to the storm.

Within Vanuatu, gale-force winds caused damage to crops, houses and water systems. Across the southern islands of Vanuatu, Jasmine impacted the area with winds of 165 km/h (103 mph). Warnings for maritime activities including small craft warnings were issued for areas offshore the islands. The cyclone produced rough seas at Port Vila, Vanuatu. Damage associated with Jasmine was mostly of agricultural nature, primarily to crops and fruit trees. Casava and banana crops were hampered by the storm, but did not pose any threat to food security. Damage to infrastructure was reported in Tanna, though the island suffered from primarily losses to food crops. Areas that had traditions of not consuming severed crops were especially impacted by the damage to food crops. Water sources in southwest Tanna were destroyed, and other sources were contaminated from mud from runoffs. In addition, three classrooms at Enukas Primary School were destroyed by Jasmine. Aniwa Island also suffered from food damage, especially to banana and manioc crops, as well as orange trees. At Aniwa Airport, high frequency radio services were cut off. Futuna Island was also cut off due to loss of communication. At Dillon's Bay, one of Erromango's primary water sources, water became contaminated. In addition, several air strips were closed due to water logging and debris. An aerial and ground damage survey began in the southern areas of the island chain after cyclone effects had subsided.

=== Solomon Islands ===
Jasmine caused intense rain showers across the island chain. The Solomon Islands Meteorological Service (SIMS) issued a Tropical Cyclone Watch Advisory throughout the day for affected areas. Isabel Province reported damage to kumara vines after three days of rain from the cyclone. Pest infestations also resulted from the rains. Most of the damage in the province resulted from overflowing rivers and inundated gardens. Makira-Ulawa Province also suffered from damaged food gardens. Cocoa bean, coconut, nut, and banana crops and plantations were damaged. In addition, bridges were washed out by flooding. The ship MV Haourosi was grounded in Maro’u Bay due to high waves offshore.

=== Tonga ===
Jasmine brought heavy rains and flooding to Tonga, which had already been impacted by heavy rains from Cyclone Cyril just a week prior. Power outages occurred across Tonga due to the storm, but power was quickly restored. International and domestic flights in Tonga were disrupted for two days due to Jasmine. Tongatapu suffered from severe flooding. Affected families were sent to evacuation shelters. Some houses reportedly collapsed and fell into creeks due to the flooding. In Nuku'alofa, a total of 400 people were evacuated. In a 24–hour period extending from 14 February to 15 February, 120 mm (4.7 in) of rain was recorded in Nuku'alofa, equal to more than half of the city's average recorded rainfall in the month of February. On Atata Island, a resort was closed for two weeks due to damage sustained from the storm. An offshore South Korean fishing boat sunk during the storm. However, its three crew members were rescued by Tongan police. An additional two fishing boats broke away from Nuku'alofa Harbor and washed up on a nearby reef. The Tongan Ministry of Health monitored the potential for diseases after the storm, particularly in low–lying areas of the island chain, where septic leakage was a potential health threat.

== See also ==
- Cyclone Yasi
- Cyclone Sarah (1994)
- Cyclone Harold
