= 2011–12 South Pacific cyclone season =

Tropical cyclone season

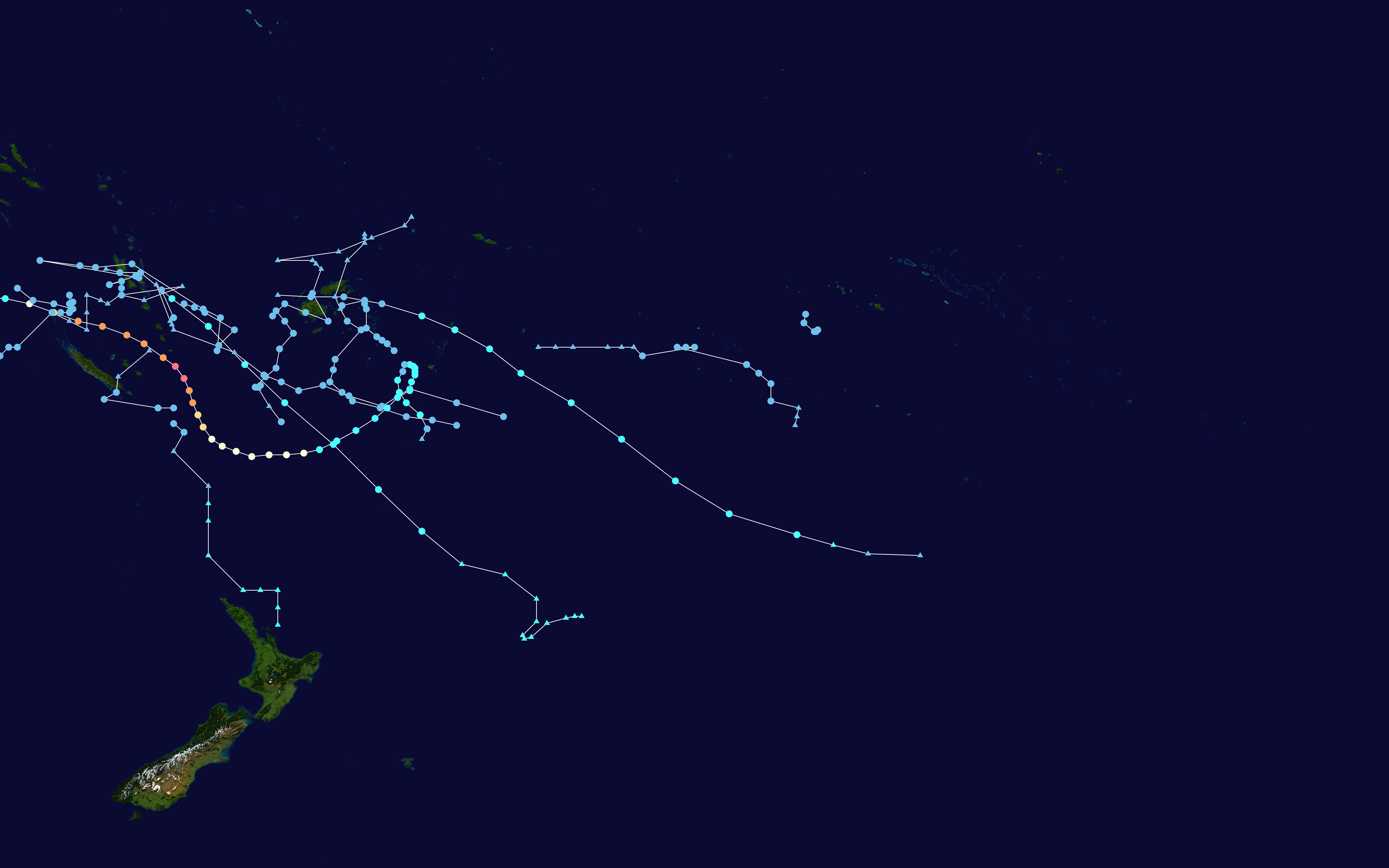
- Season summary map

Seasonal boundaries
- First system formed: November 13, 2011
- Last system dissipated: April 11, 2012

Strongest storm
- Name: Jasmine
  - Maximum winds: 195 km/h (120 mph) (10-minute sustained)
  - Lowest pressure: 937 hPa (mbar)

Seasonal statistics
- Total disturbances: 20
- Total depressions: 16
- Tropical cyclones: 3 (tied, second lowest with 2003–04)
- Severe tropical cyclones: 1
- Total fatalities: 18
- Total damage: > $17.2 million (2012 USD)

Related articles
- 2011–12 Australian region cyclone season; 2011–12 South-West Indian Ocean cyclone season

The 2011–12 South Pacific cyclone season was one of the least active South Pacific tropical cyclone seasons on record, with only three tropical cyclones occurring during the season. The season ran from November 1, 2011, to April 30, 2012, however, any tropical cyclones that form before June 30, 2012, would have fallen within the 2011–12 tropical cyclone year and would have counted towards the season total. The strongest and only severe tropical cyclone that occurred during the season was Severe Tropical Cyclone Jasmine, which tracked in from out of the South Pacific basin. Within the basin, tropical cyclones are monitored by the Regional Specialized Meteorological Center (RSMC) in Nadi, Fiji, and the Tropical Cyclone Warning Center (TCWC) in Wellington, New Zealand. RSMC Nadi attaches an F designation to tropical disturbances that form in or move into the South Pacific. The United States Joint Typhoon Warning Center (JTWC) issues unofficial warnings within the South Pacific, designating tropical storm-equivalent or greater tropical cyclones with a number and a P suffix. RSMC Nadi and TCWC Wellington both use the Australian Tropical Cyclone Intensity Scale, and measure windspeeds over a period of ten minutes, while the JTWC measures sustained winds over a period of one minute and uses the Saffir–Simpson hurricane scale.

== Seasonal forecasts ==
Source/Record	Region	Tropical Cyclone	Severe Tropical Cyclones	Ref
Records
Average (1969–70 – 2010–11):	160°E – 120°W	9	4	
Record high:	160°E – 120°W	1997–98: 16	1982–83:10	
Record low:	160°E – 120°W	2003–04: 3	2008–09: 0	
Predictions
FMS	135°E – 120°W	5–8	4–5	
NIWA October	135°E – 120°W	5–8	—	
NIWA February	135°E – 120°W	8–10	—	
Actual activity:	160°E – 120°W	3	1	

Ahead of the season officially starting on November 1, the Fiji Meteorological Service (FMS) and New Zealand's National Institute of Water and Atmospheric Research (NIWA), both issued a tropical cyclone outlook that discussed the upcoming season. These outlooks took into account a variety of factors such as a developing weak to moderate La Niña event and what had happened in previous seasons such as 1971–72, 1974–75, 1976–77, 1983–84, 1985–86, 1985–86, 2000–01, 2005–06, 2007–08 and 2008–09. The Southwest Pacific tropical cyclone outlook issued by New Zealand's National Institute of Water and Atmospheric Research (NIWA) in conjunction with MetService and various other Pacific meteorological services, predicted that five to eight tropical cyclones would occur over the South Pacific Ocean between 135°E and 120°W. The outlook also predicted that one of these tropical cyclones would intensify further and become either a Category three, four or five severe tropical cyclone on the Australian tropical cyclone intensity scale.

In addition to contributing towards the Southwest Pacific tropical cyclone outlook, the FMS predicted that between five and eight tropical cyclones would occur within the basin, while four or five of these tropical cyclones were expected to intensify further and become either a category three, four or five severe tropical cyclone on the Australian scale. Both outlooks also predicted that the majority of systems would occur to the west of the International Dateline, which as a result meant that New Caledonia and Vanuatu had a high chance of being impacted by a tropical cyclone. It was also predicted that Fiji, Tonga and the Cook Islands had a moderate to high risk of being impacted by a tropical cyclone, while Niue, Wallis & Futuna, Samoa and the Solomon Islands all had a moderate risk. During February 2012, after two tropical cyclones had already occurred in the Australian region, NIWA updated its seasonal outlook and suggested that between 8 and 10 tropical cyclones would occur over the region during the season.

== Seasonal summary ==
Despite predictions of between 5-8 tropical cyclones occurring within the South Pacific Basin, with only two tropical cyclones developing in the basin, while Jasmine moved in from the Australian region. The first tropical disturbance of the season developed on November 13, to the north-east of Fiji and moved south-eastwards before it weakened into an area of low pressure during November 17, as it affected Fiji.

On February 6, Cyclone Jasmine moved into RSMC Nadi's area of responsibility, and became the first named tropical cyclone since Tropical Cyclone Bune, the previous March, to exist in the South Pacific basin.

== Systems ==
=== Tropical Disturbance 01F ===
- Tropical disturbance (Australian scale)
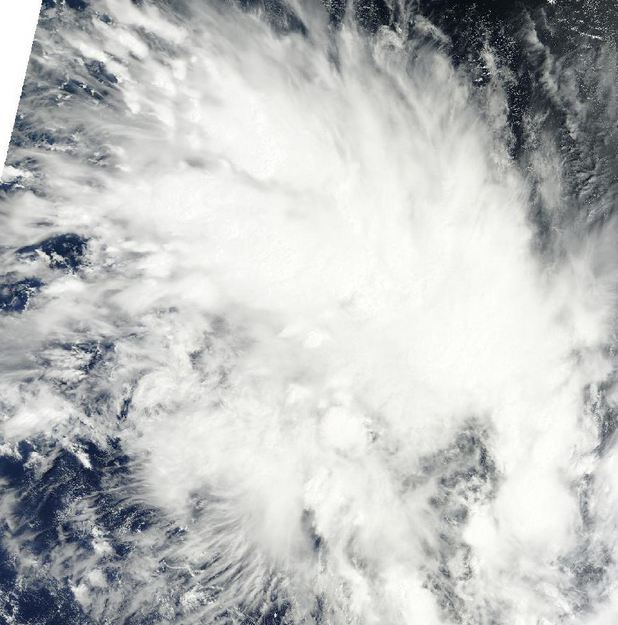
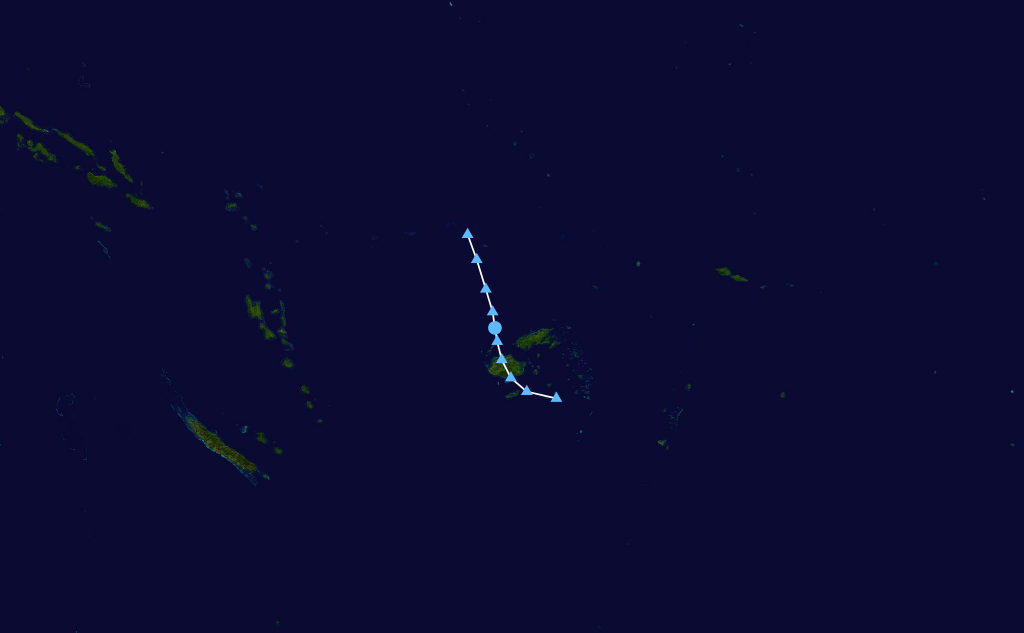
- Duration: November 13 – November 16
- Peak intensity: Winds not specified; 1004 hPa (mbar)

On November 13, an area of low pressure located within the South Pacific convergence zone started to rapidly develop further. RSMC Nadi then declared the low-pressure area: Tropical Depression 01F later that day, while it was located about 400 km (250 mi) to the north of Suva, Fiji. During the next day, the disturbance moved towards the southwest and onto the main Fijian Islands before convection surrounding the system started to weaken due to land interaction. The disturbance remained over the Fijian Islands until November 16, before RSMC Nadi issued their final advisory on the system as 01F had dissipated. Within Fiji, torrential rainfall was experienced on November 14, over the whole of the Fijian islands, which lead to widespread flooding of low-lying areas, while strong winds prevailed over the Lau and Lomaiviti group of islands during the next day as the rain gradually eased.

=== Tropical Depression 02F ===
- Tropical depression (Australian scale)
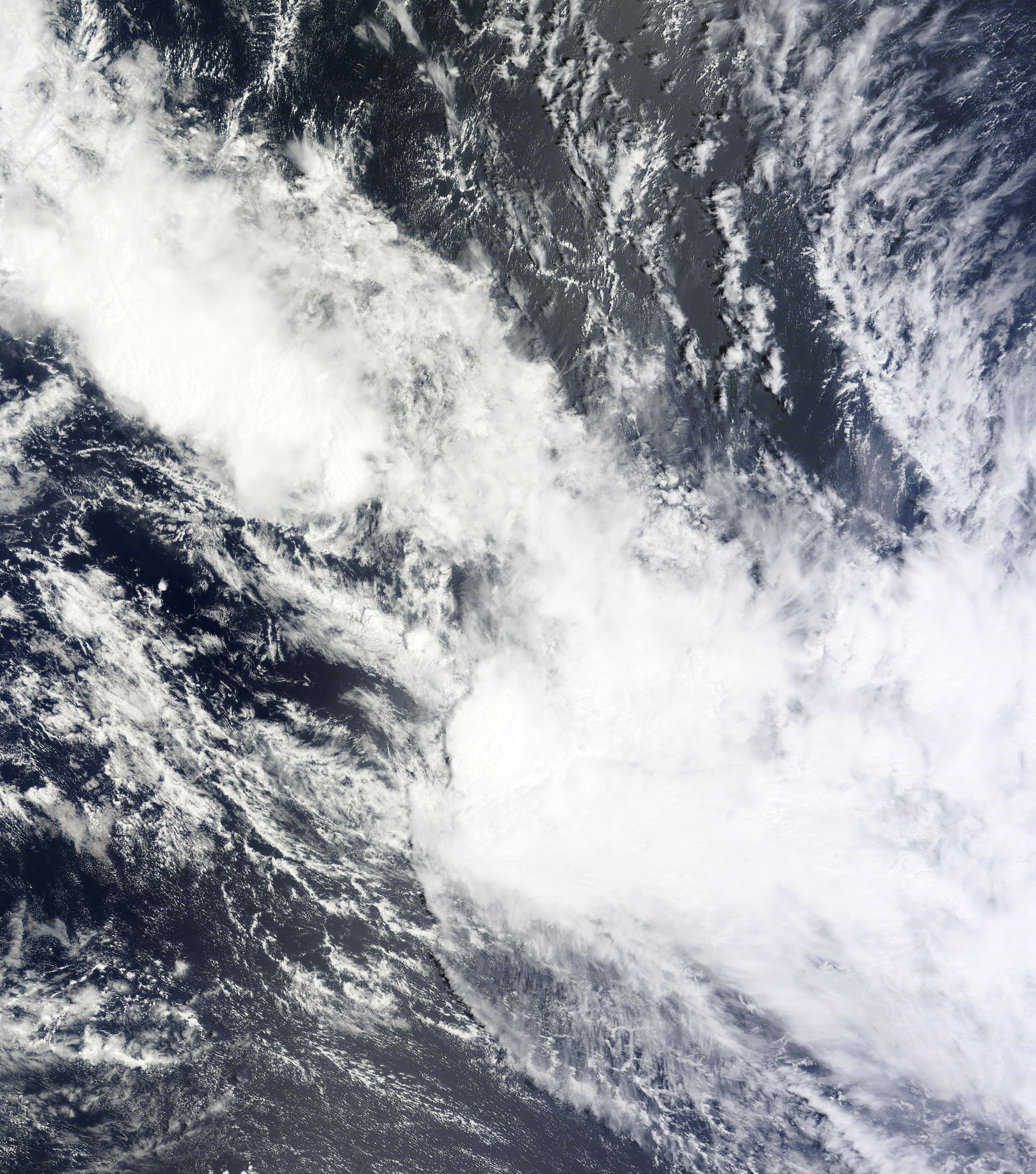
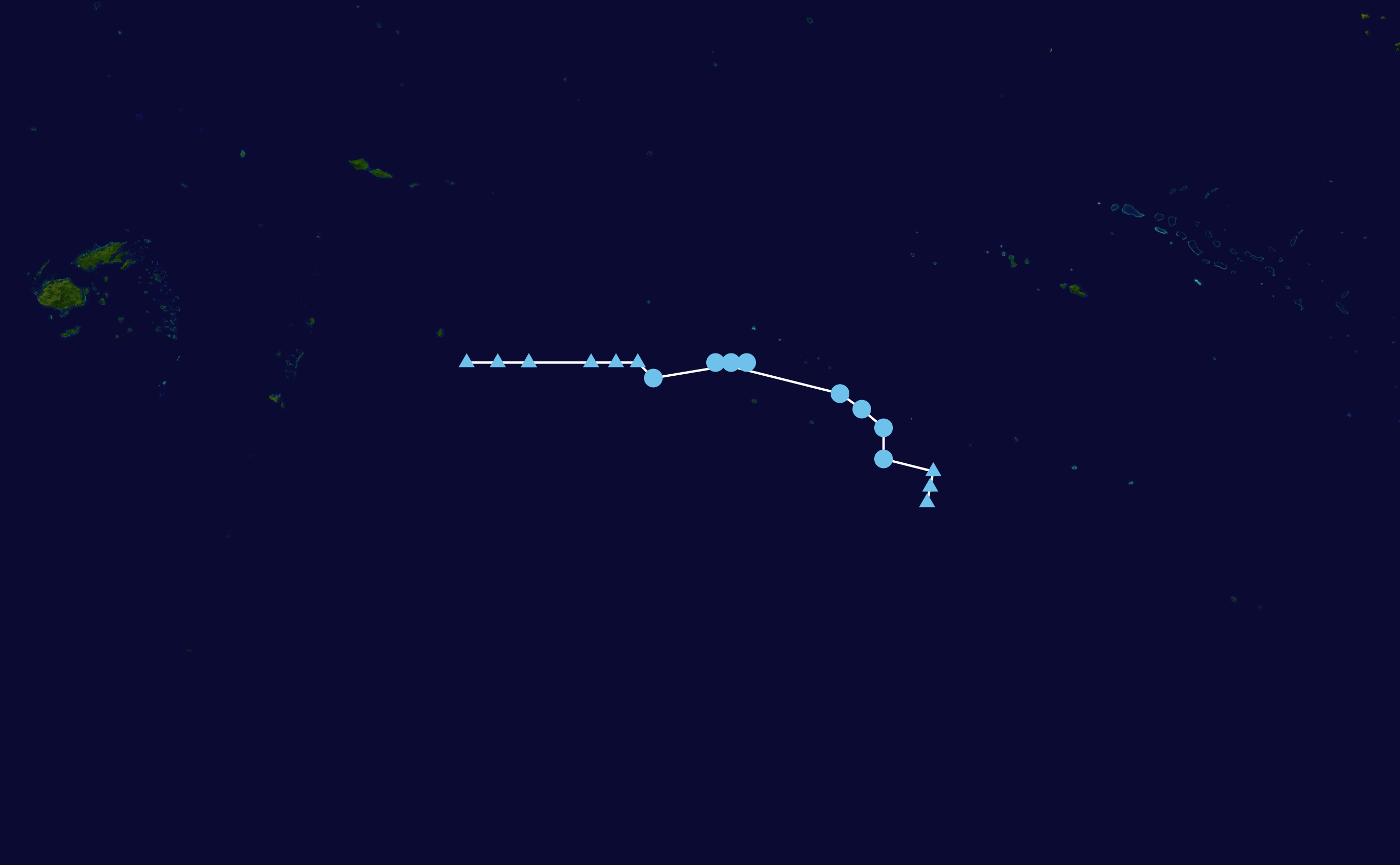
- Duration: December 28 – January 1
- Peak intensity: Winds not specified; 1002 hPa (mbar)

Early on December 28, RSMC Nadi reported that Tropical Disturbance 02F had developed within an area of moderate windshear, about 140 km (90 mi) to the southeast of Alofi on the island of Niue. During the next day, the disturbance moved towards the east, before it developed into a tropical depression during the next day.

=== Tropical Disturbance 03F ===
- Tropical disturbance (Australian scale)
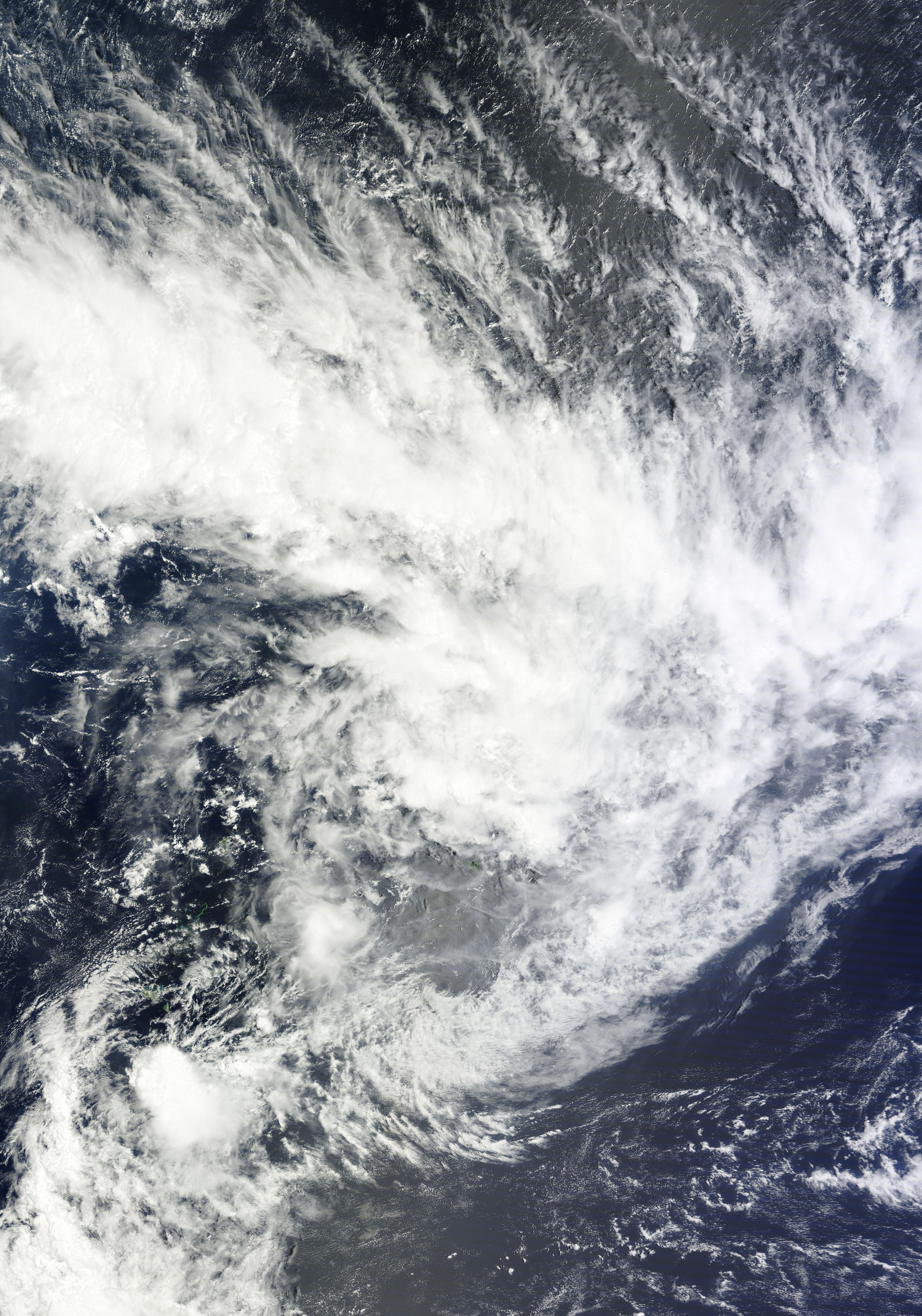
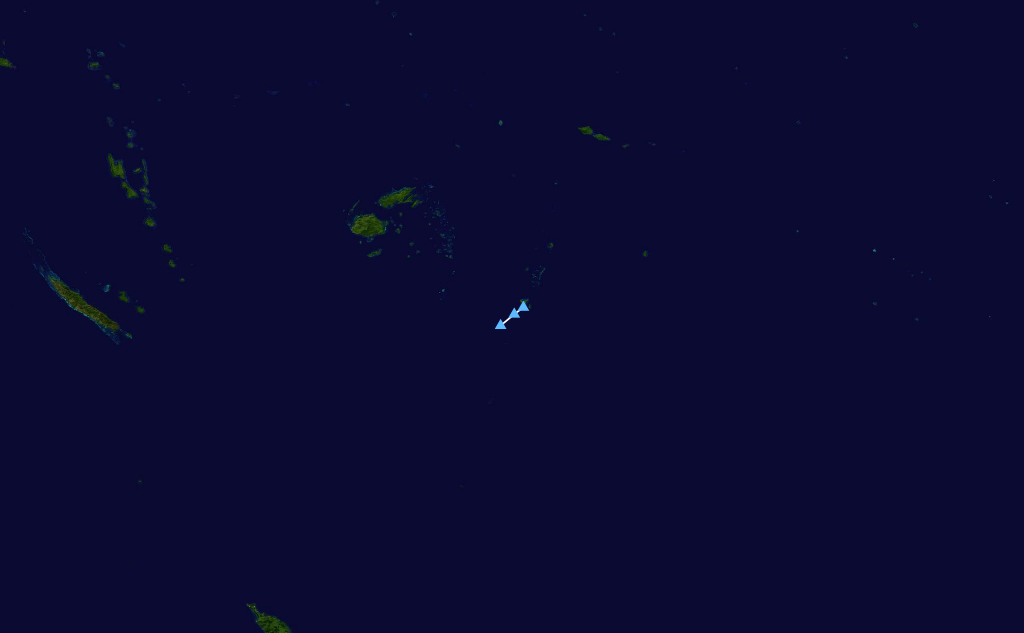
- Duration: January 7 – January 8
- Peak intensity: Winds not specified; 1001 hPa (mbar)

On January 7, RSMC Nadi started to monitor a tropical disturbance that had developed about 240 km (150 mi), to the southeast of Lifuka, Tonga. Over the next 24 hours the disturbance persisted in a weekly sheered environment to the southeast of an upper-level outflow centre. However late the next day, RSMC Nadi reported that the disturbance was not expected to develop any further and issued their final advisory on the system, since convection had been irregularly surrounding the system during that day.

=== Tropical Depression 04F ===
- Tropical depression (Australian scale)
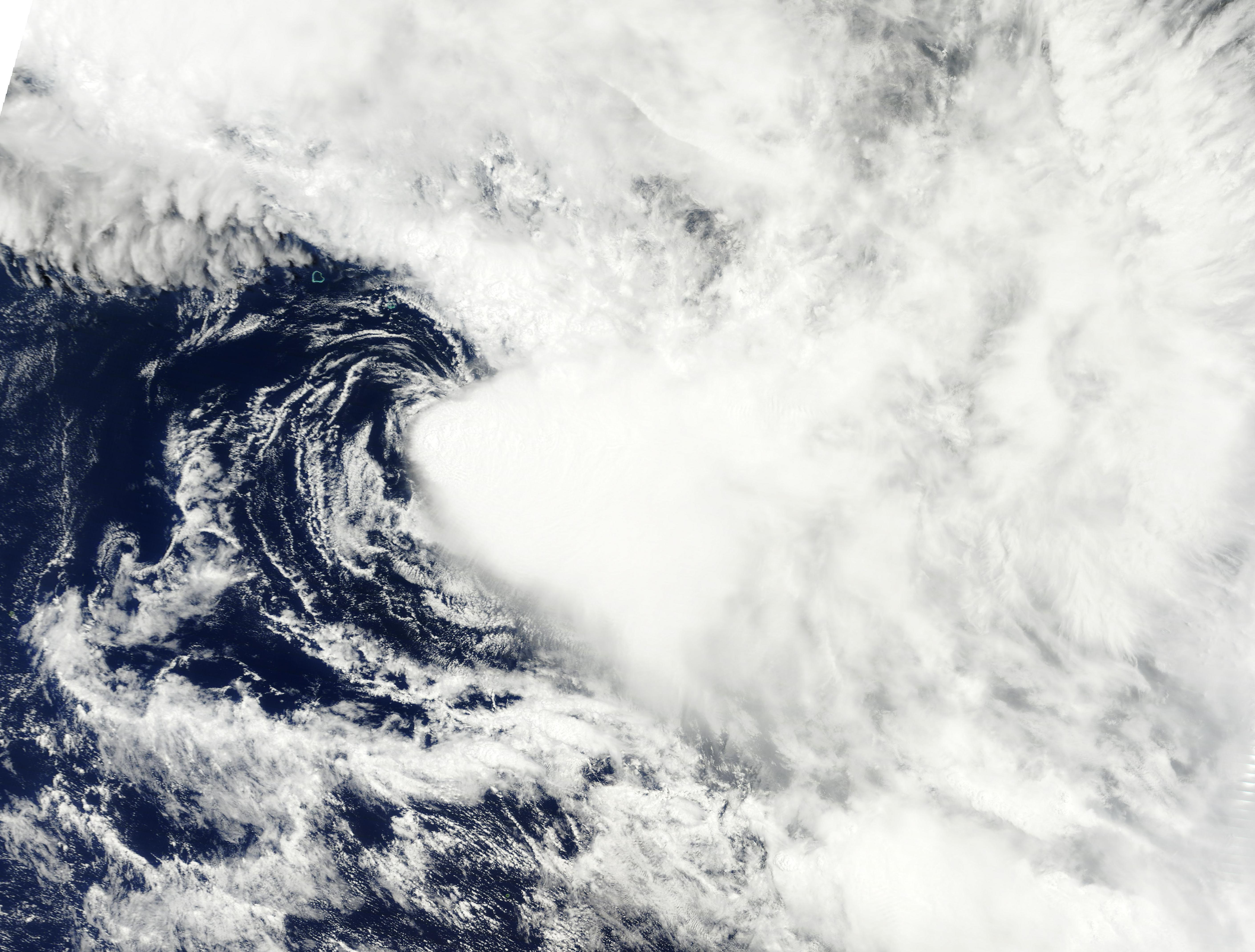
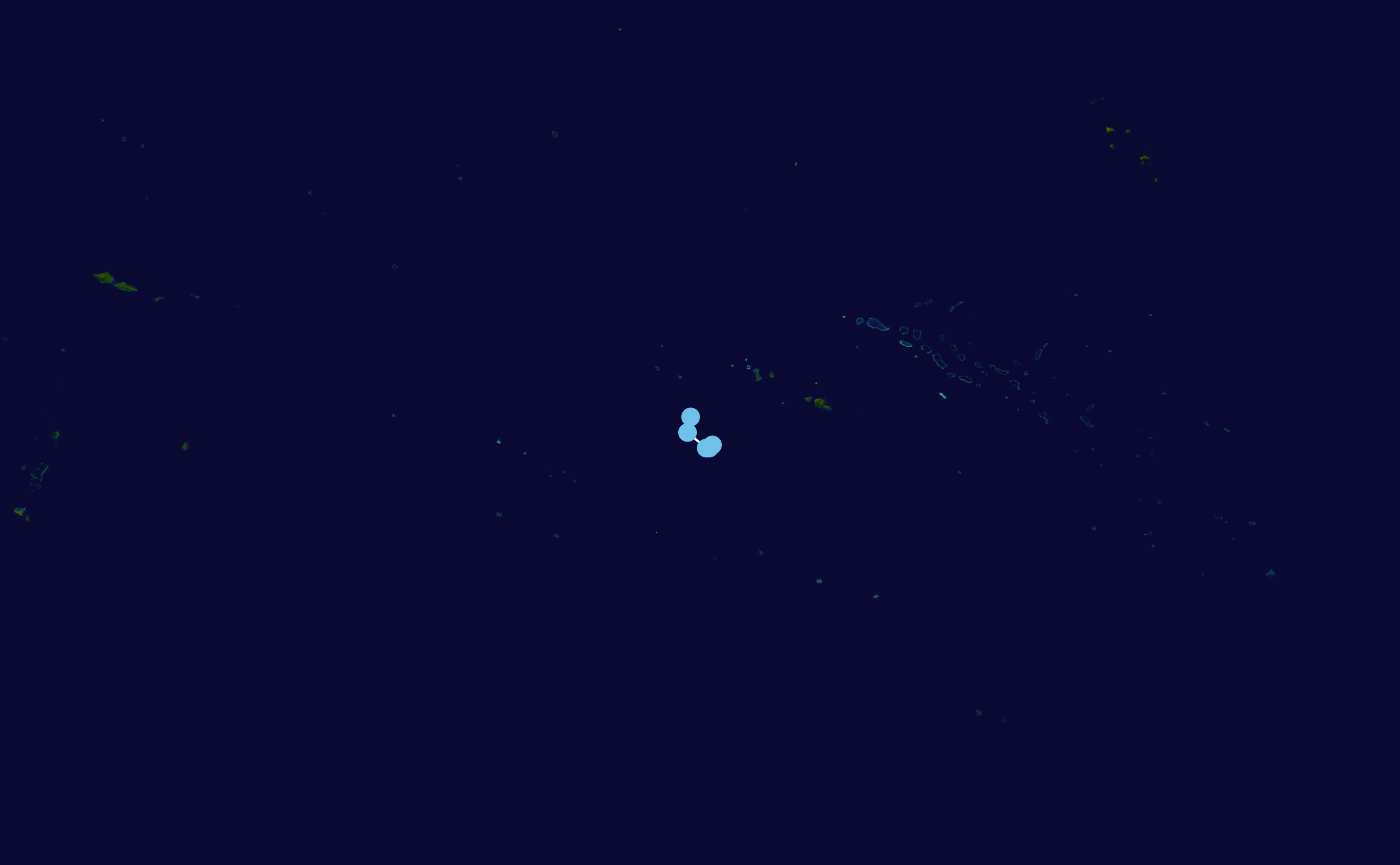
- Duration: January 8 – January 9
- Peak intensity: Winds not specified; 1000 hPa (mbar)

On January 8, RSMC Nadi reported that Tropical Depression 04F had developed, about 465 km (290 mi) to the west of Papeete on the French Polynesian island of Tahiti. 04F had an exposed low level circulation centre and was situated to the east of a trough of low pressure and to the west of an area of enhanced convection. Over the next 24 hours, convection surrounding the system became increasingly displaced to the far east of the exposed low level circulation centre because of strong vertical wind shear. As a result, RSMC Nadi issued their final warning on 04F, late on January 9.

=== Tropical Disturbance 05F ===
- Tropical disturbance (Australian scale)
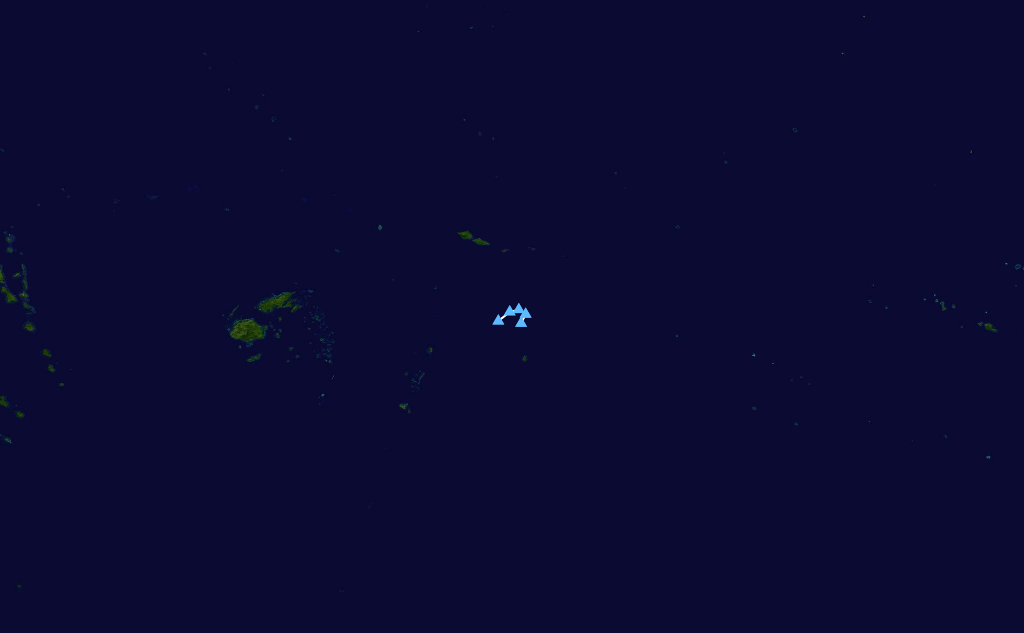
- Duration: January 8 – January 10
- Peak intensity: Winds not specified; 1000 hPa (mbar)

Late on January 8, RSMC Nadi reported that Tropical Disturbance 05F had developed within a trough of low pressure, about 460 km (285 mi) to the southeast of Apia, Samoa. Over the next few days the disturbance did not develop any further, before RSMC Nadi issued their final advisory on the disturbance during January 10.

=== Tropical Depression 06F ===
- Tropical depression (Australian scale)
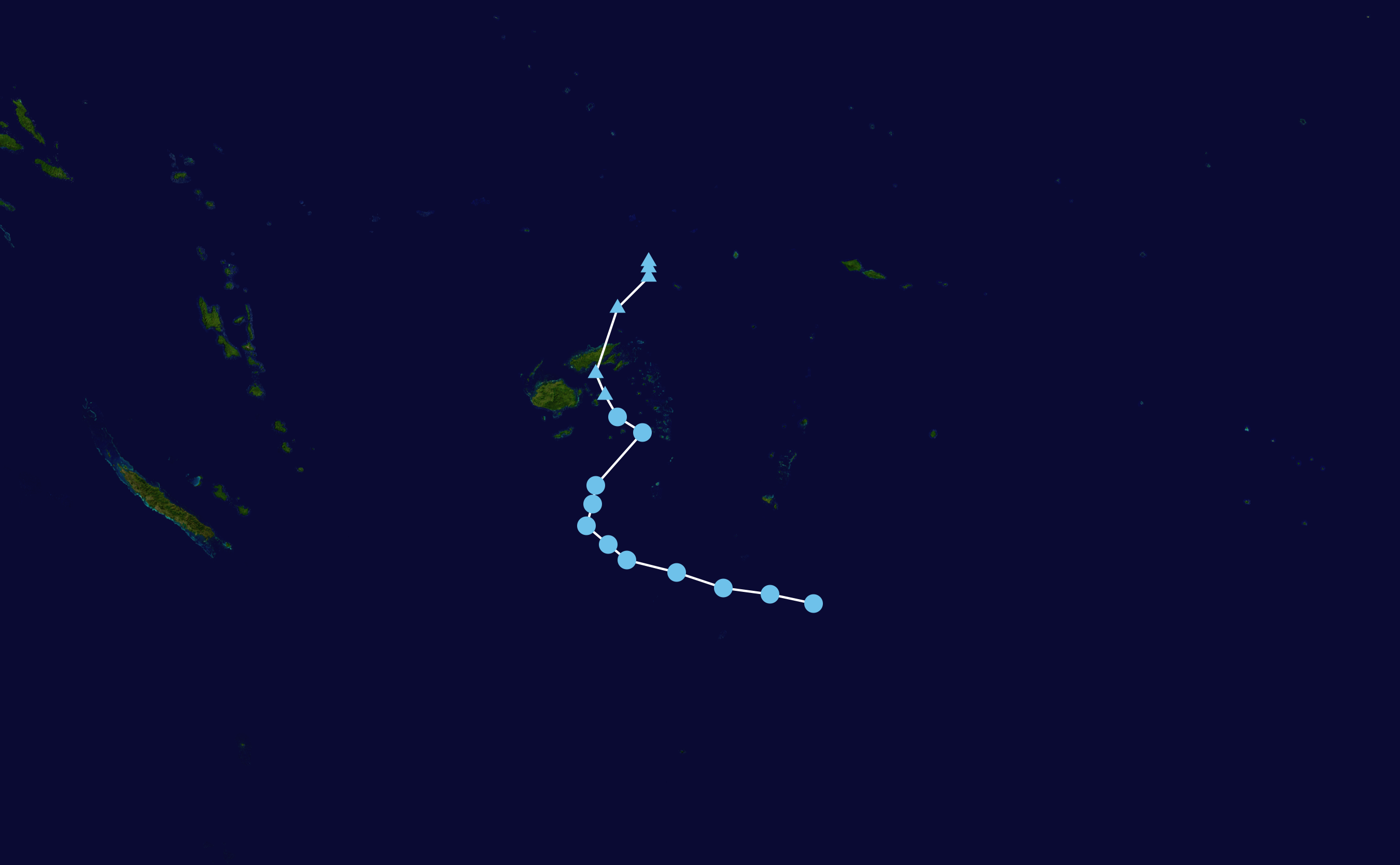
- Duration: January 19 – January 25
- Peak intensity: Winds not specified; 1001 hPa (mbar)

On January 19, RSMC Nadi reported that Tropical Disturbance 06F, had developed along an active trough of low pressure to the north of Fiji. Over the next couple of days, the disturbance moved towards the south before it developed into a tropical depression and moved across Vanua Levu during January 21. Over the next few days the depression, remained near stationary over central parts of the country and caused widespread heavy rainfall and strong winds, over Fiji's Northern and Eastern divisions which lead to flooding. The depression was last noted on January 25, as it weakened and moved off Fiji and started to move towards the southeast.

=== Tropical Depression 07F ===
- Tropical depression (Australian scale)
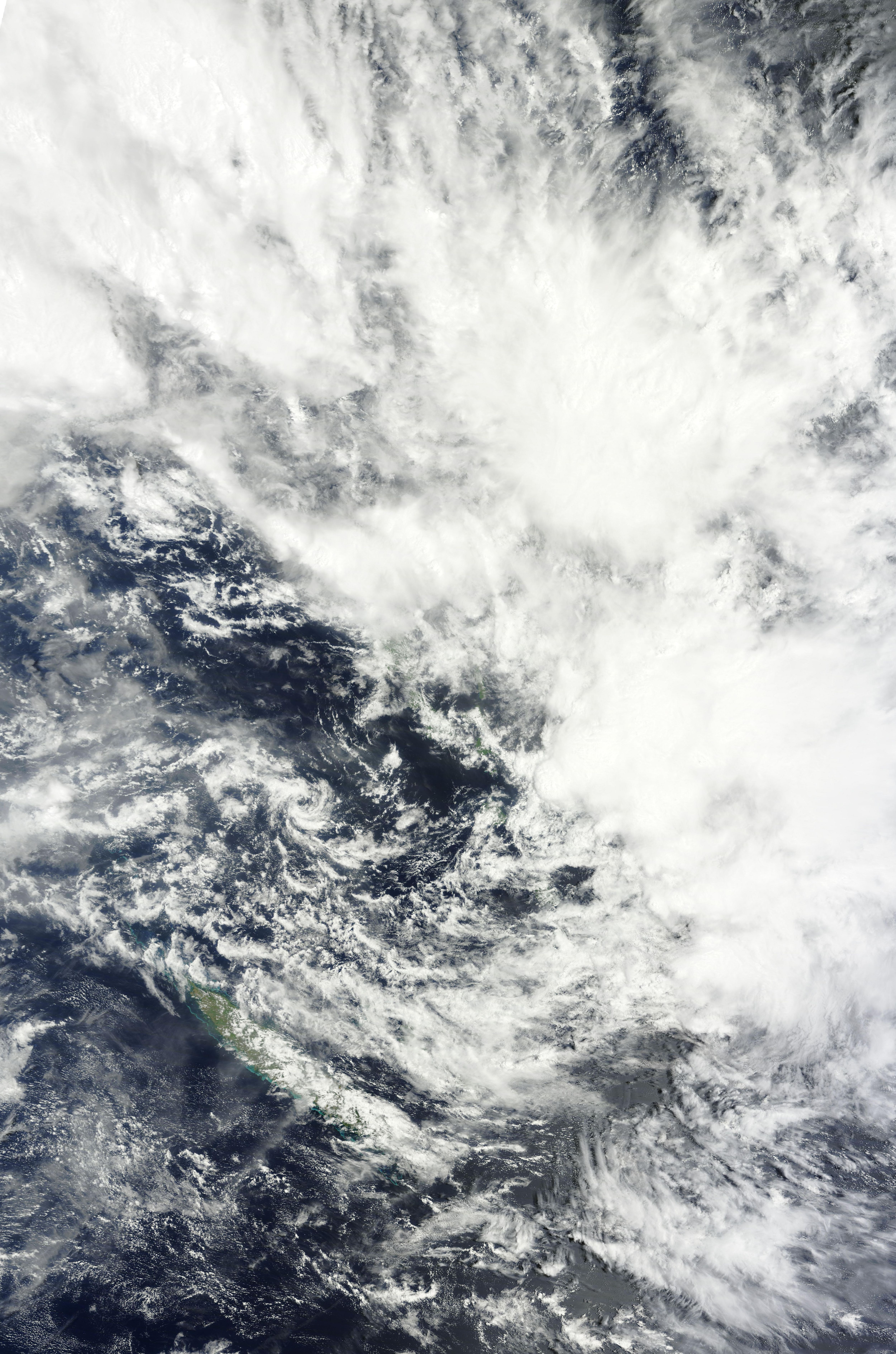
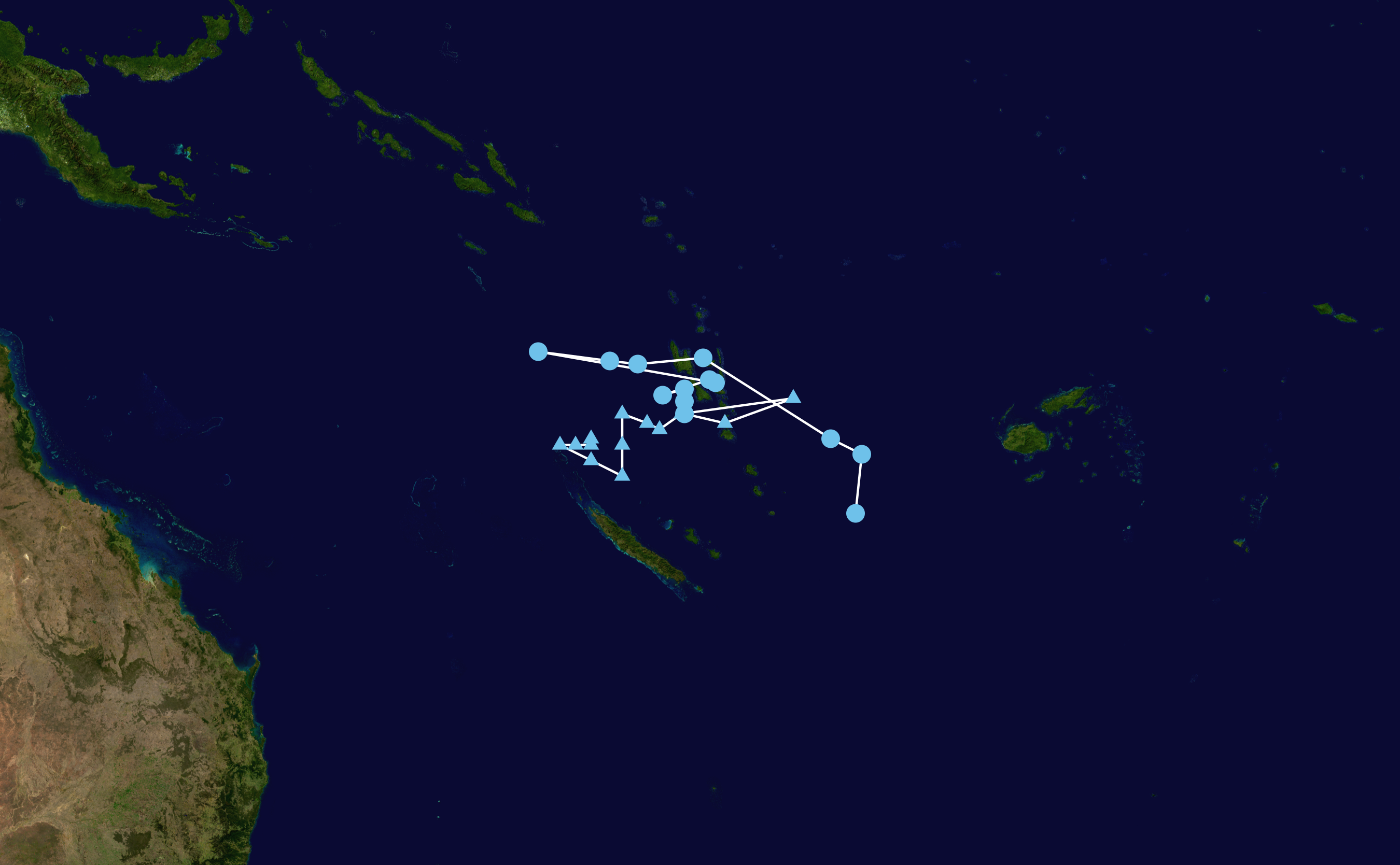
- Duration: January 26 – February 2
- Peak intensity: 55 km/h (35 mph) (10-min); 994 hPa (mbar)

The RSMC Nadi reported that a tropical disturbance formed near Vanuatu on January 26, and strengthened into a tropical depression on January 29. But on February 1, 07F rapidly became disorganized, and as it began an extratropical transition, the RMSC Nadi issued their last advisory on the storm. On February 2, 07F completed its extratropical transition, and thus it was dropped from the RMSC Nadi's advisories.

=== Tropical Depression 08F ===
- Tropical depression (Australian scale)
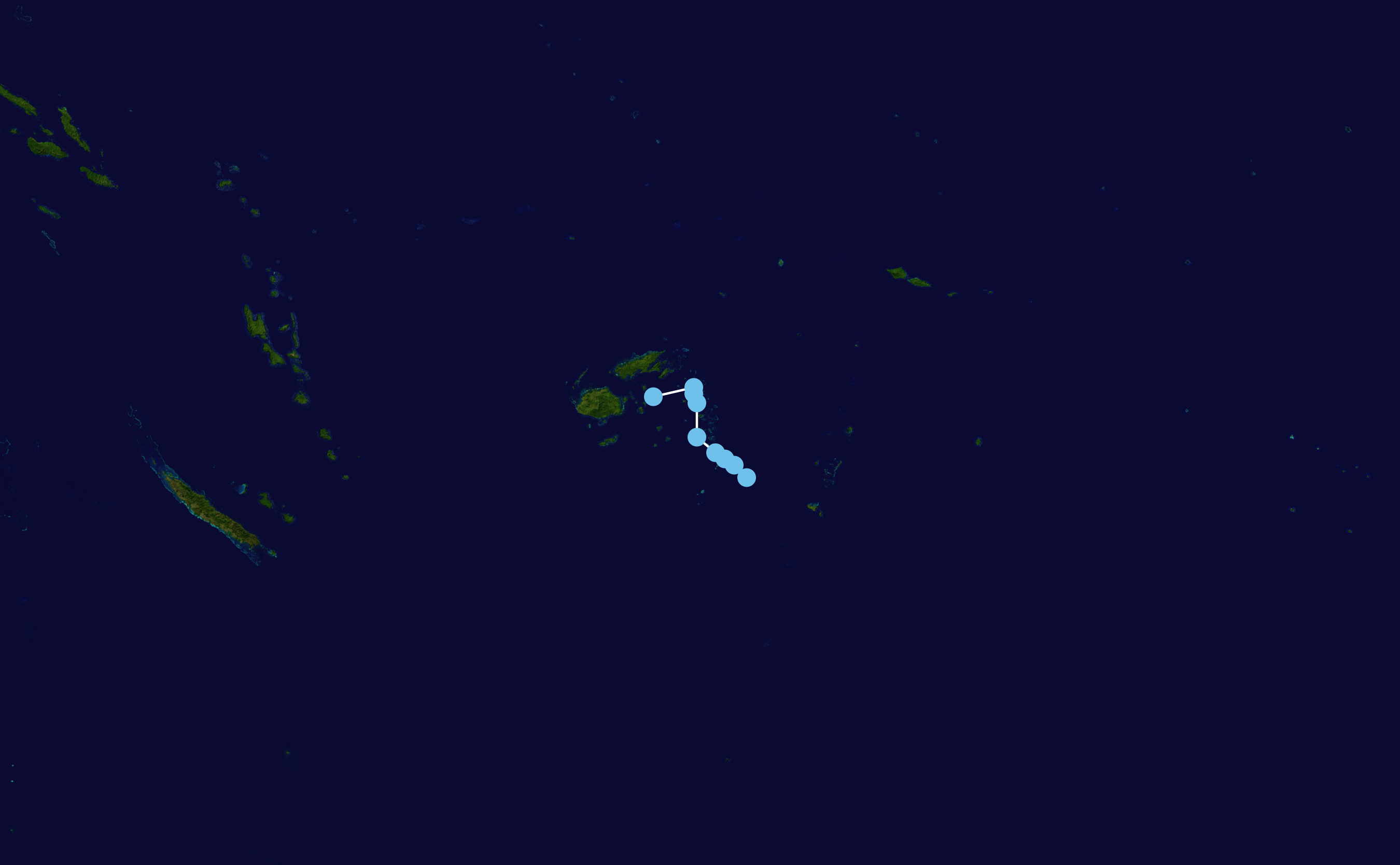
- Duration: January 25 – January 28
- Peak intensity: Winds not specified; 1001 hPa (mbar)

On January 25, RSMC Nadi reported that a shallow tropical depression, had developed over the northern Lau Islands, within a weak surface trough of low pressure. Over the next couple of days the depression moved southwards through the Lau and Lomaiviti islands and moved into an area of moderate to high vertical windshear. The depression was last noted by RSMC Nadi on January 28, as it moved out of the Fijian archipelago.

=== Tropical Depression 09F ===
- Tropical depression (Australian scale)
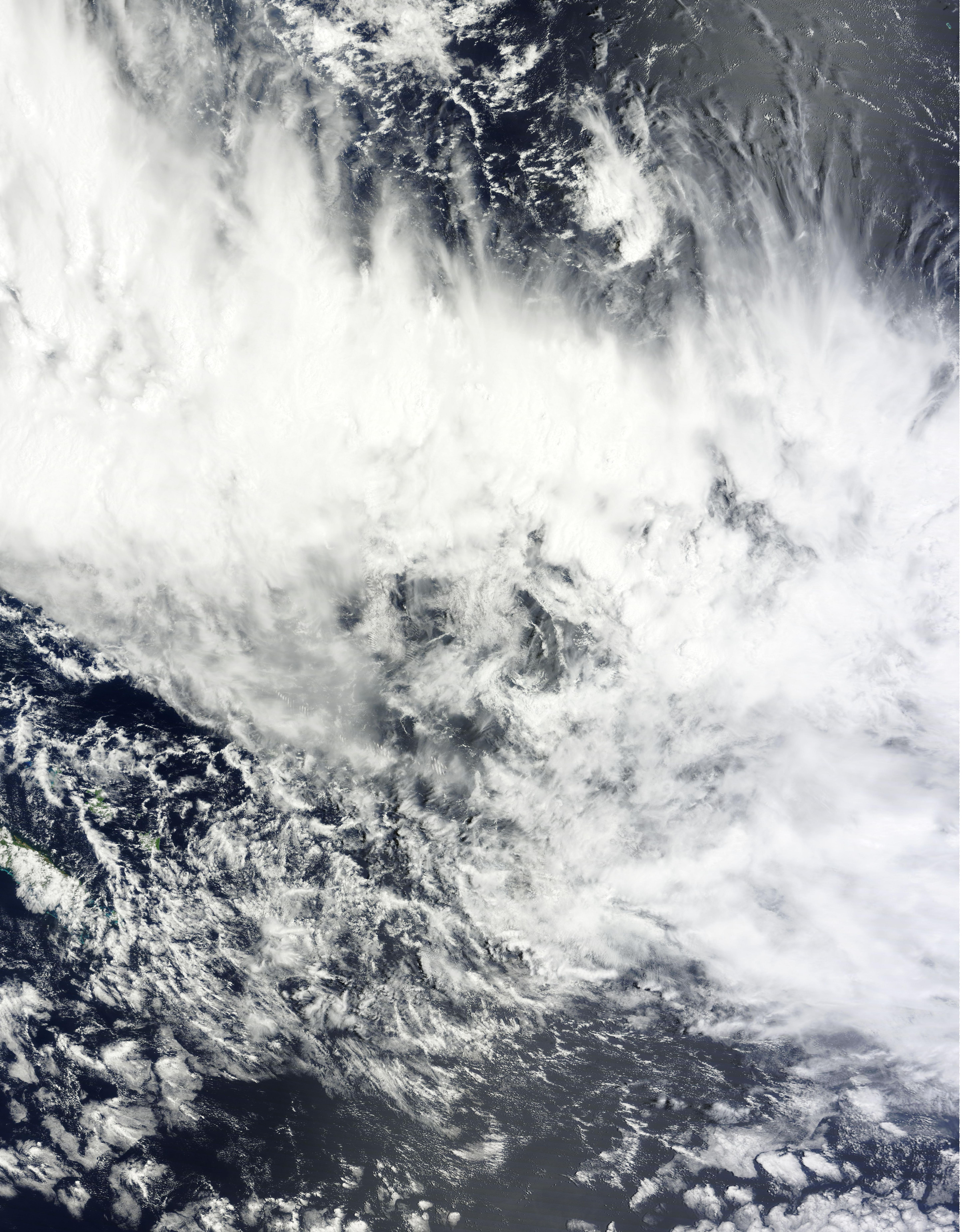
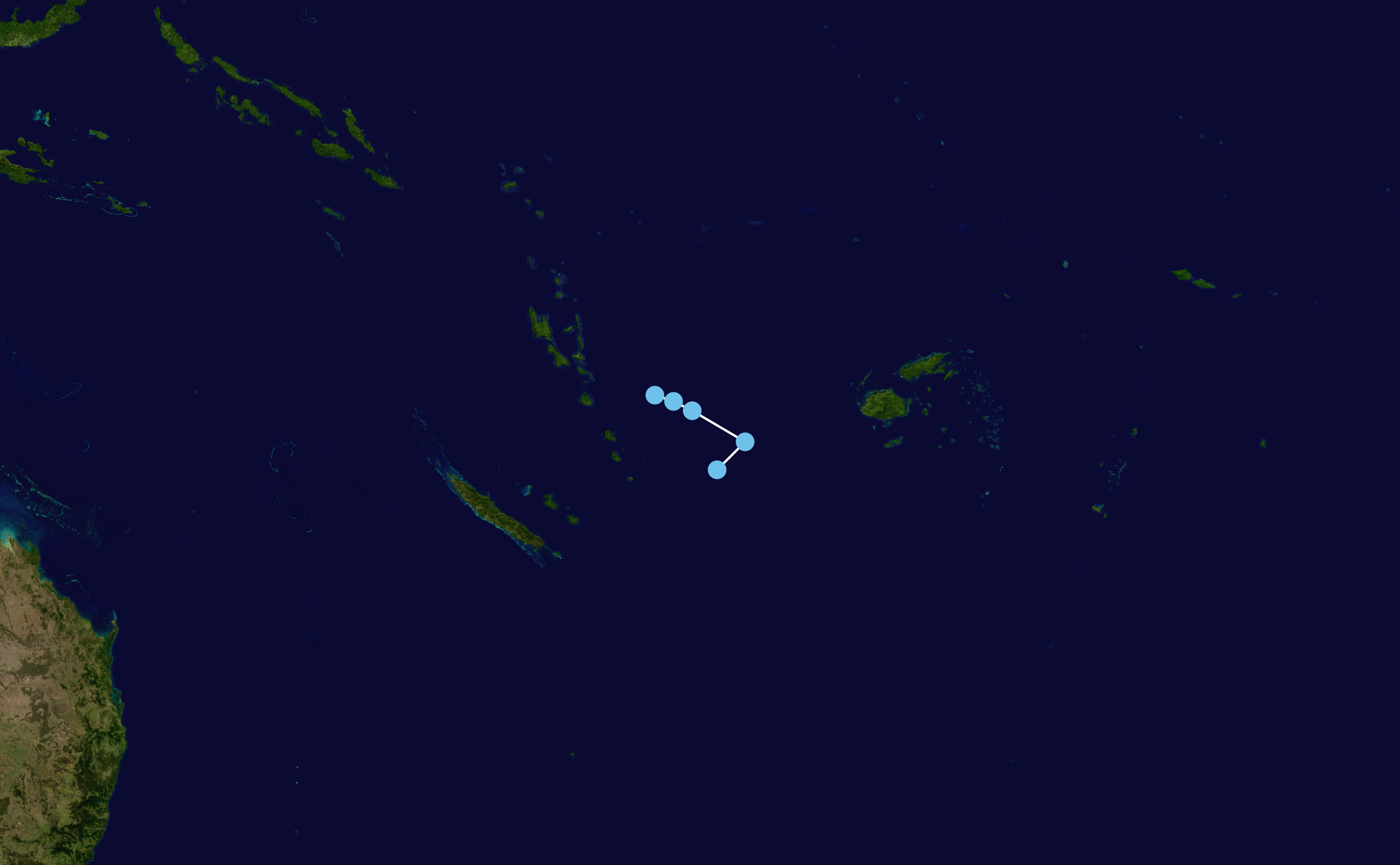
- Duration: January 30 – January 31
- Peak intensity: 55 km/h (35 mph) (10-min); 998 hPa (mbar)

On January 30, RSMC Nadi reported that a tropical depression had developed about 250 km (150 mi) to the northeast of Port Vila, in Vanuatu. On January 31, RSMC Nadi issued their last advisory on 09F, as the system rapidly became disorganized.

Between February 1 and 4, a convergence zone associated with the remnants of Tropical Depression 09F, affected Fiji and caused widespread rainfall over the islands.

=== Tropical Depression 10F ===
- Tropical depression (Australian scale)
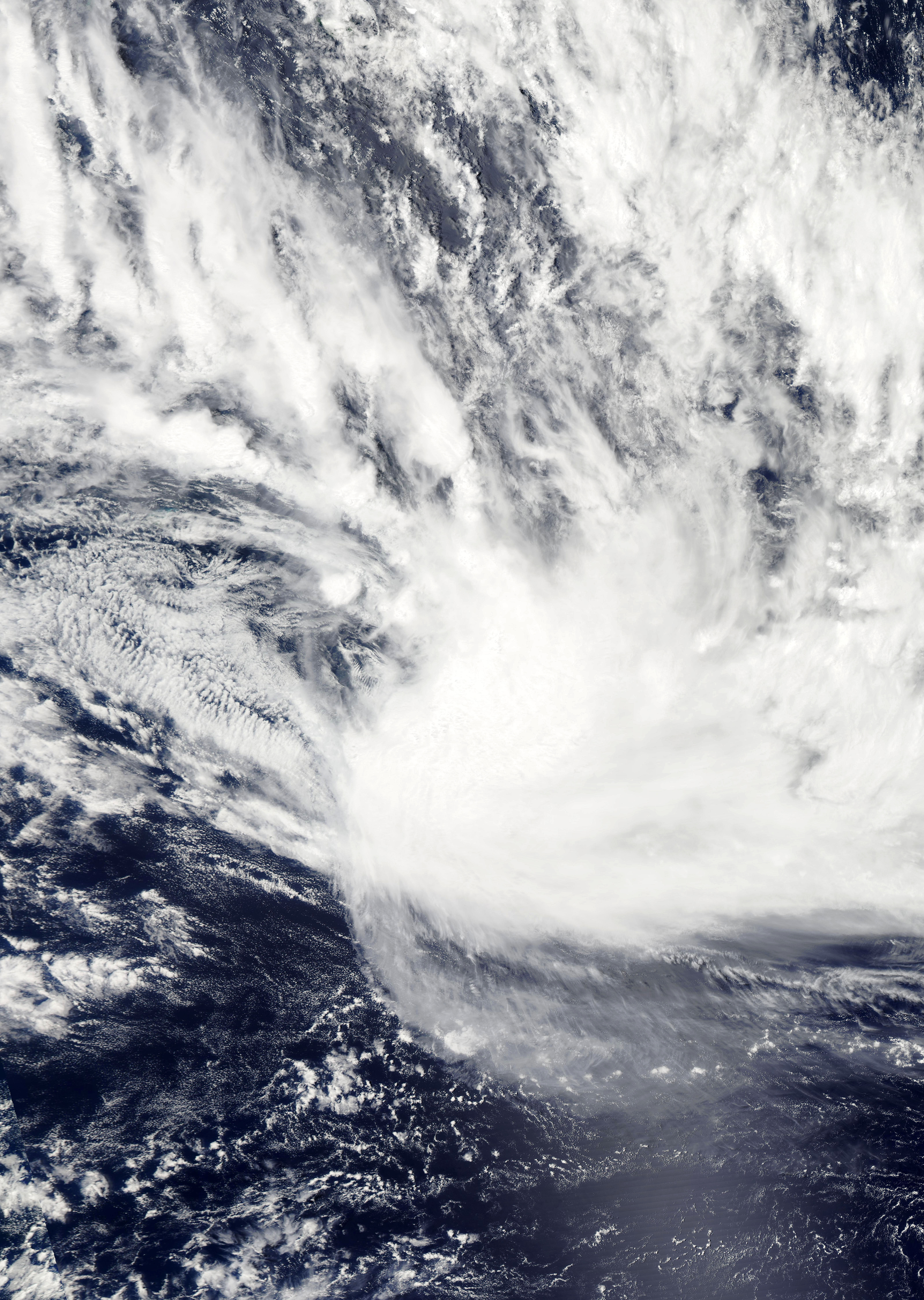
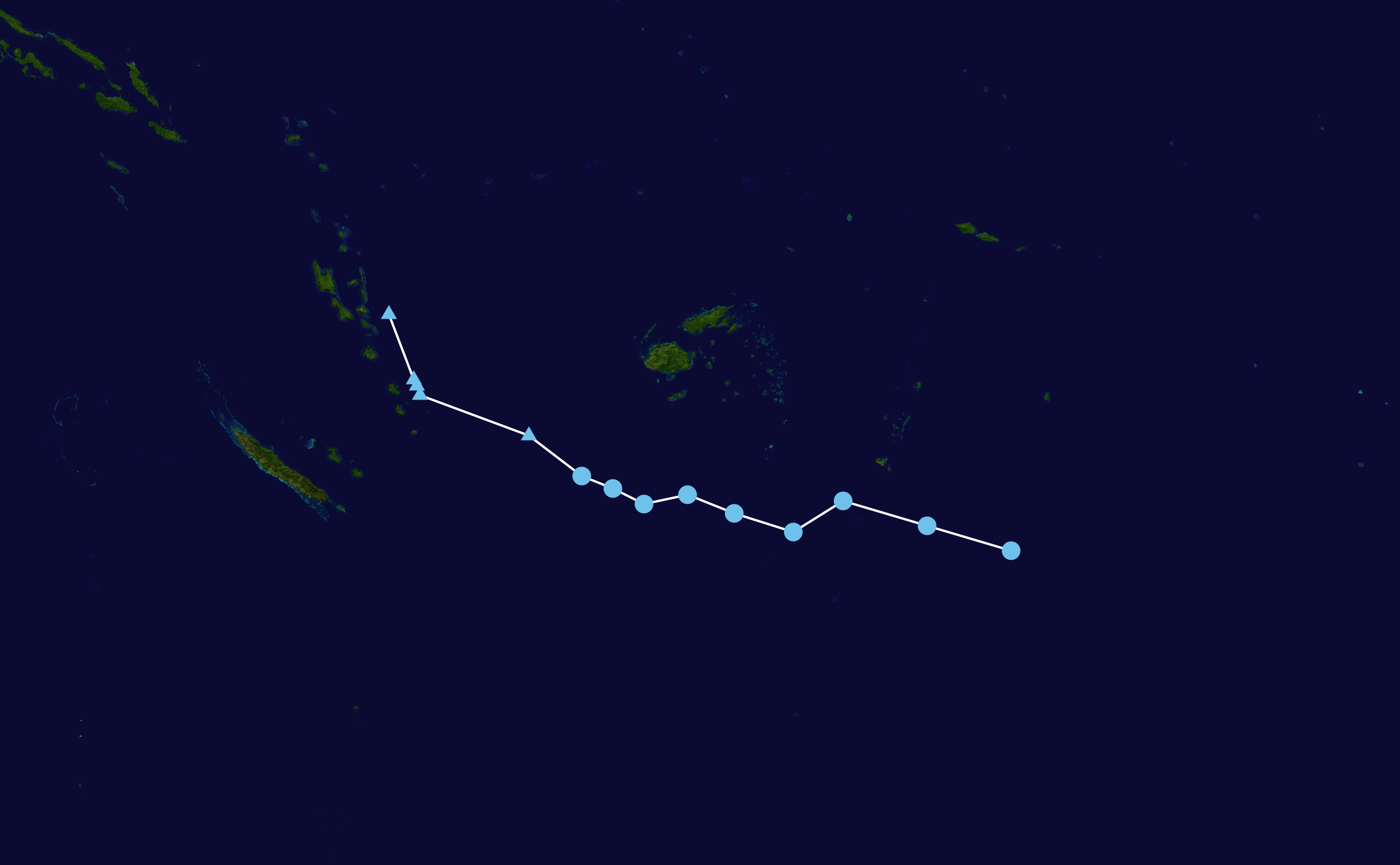
- Duration: February 2 – February 6
- Peak intensity: 35 km/h (25 mph) (10-min); 991 hPa (mbar)

On February 2, the RSMC Nadi reported that a tropical depression had formed east of New Caledonia. For the 4 few days, 10F began to accelerate towards the southeast. However, late on February 6, the storm weakened below tropical disturbance intensity, and the RSMC Nadi issued their last advisory on the storm.

=== Tropical Cyclone Cyril ===
- Category 2 tropical cyclone (Australian scale)
- Tropical storm (SSHWS)
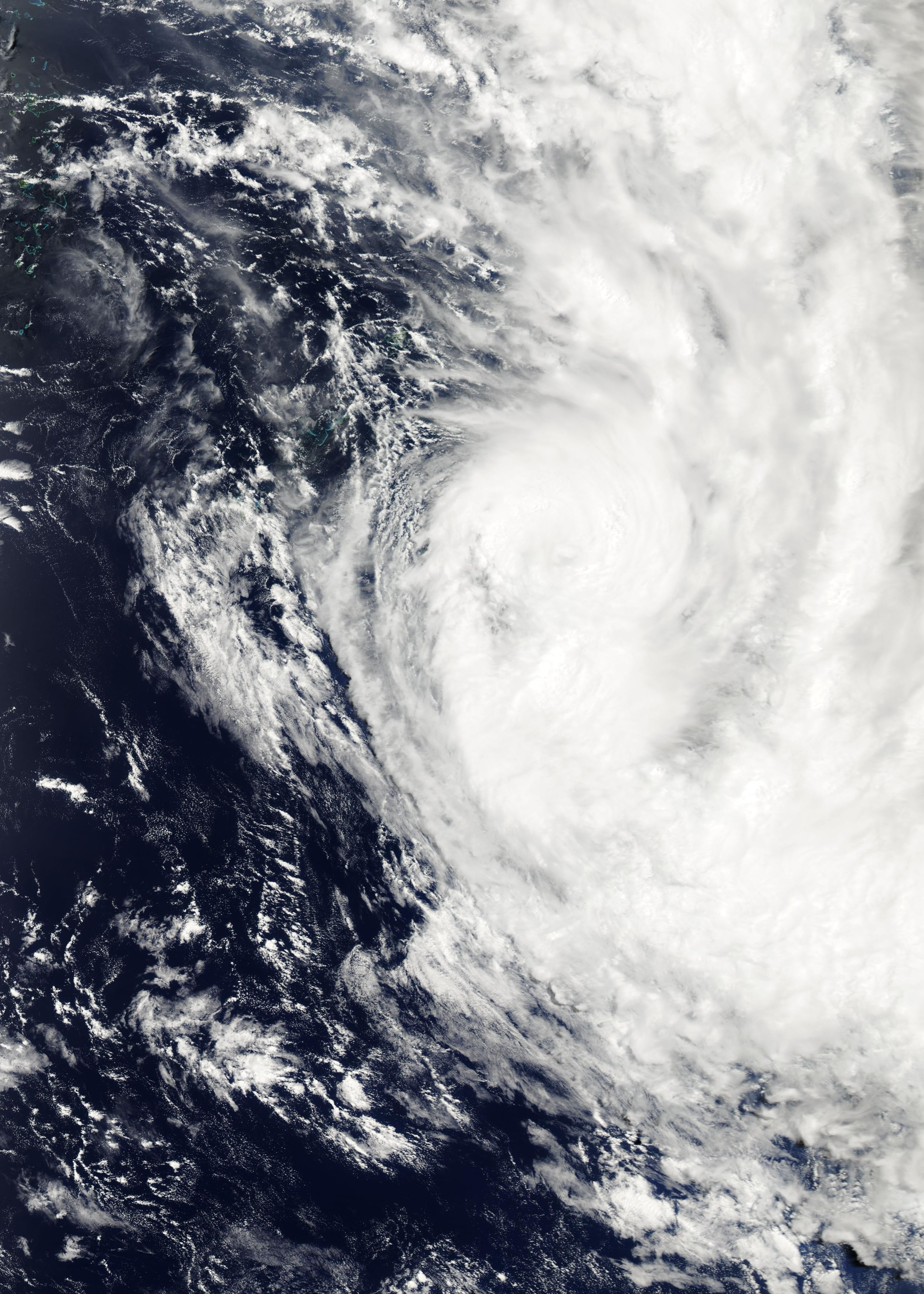
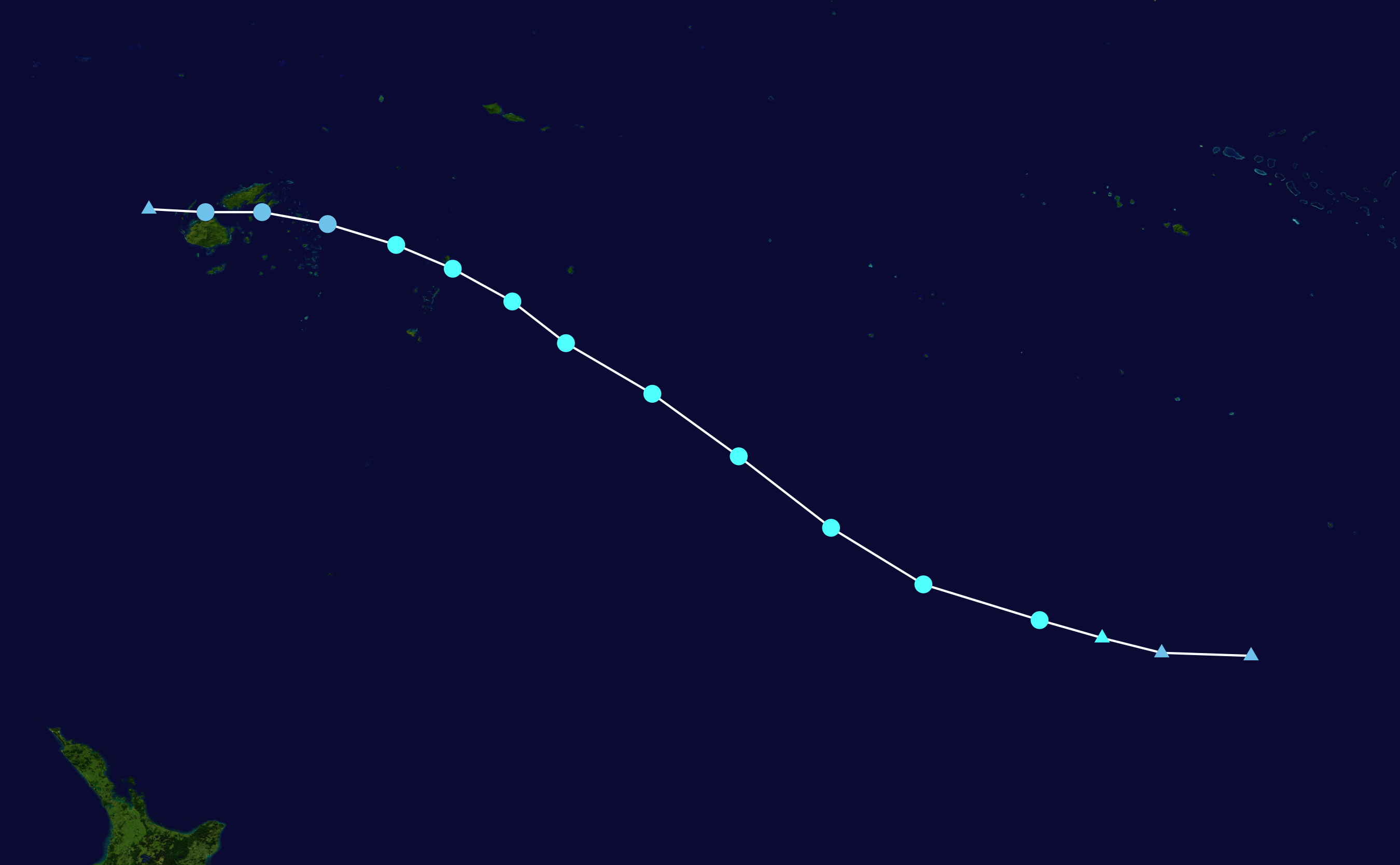
- Duration: February 5 – February 8
- Peak intensity: 95 km/h (60 mph) (10-min); 985 hPa (mbar)

During February 5, Tropical Depression 11F developed about 60 km (35 mi) to the north-east of Nadi, Fiji.

On February 5, the FMS reported that a tropical disturbance had developed, about 310 km (190 mi) to the southeast of Nadi, Fiji. During that day the disturbance moved towards the northeast and passed through the Fijian islands, while convection surrounding the system increased and organized before it was declared a tropical depression early the next day. Later that day as the system started to move towards the southeast it rapidly consolidated further with the JTWC and the FMS both reporting that the depression had developed into a tropical cyclone, with the later naming it Cyril as it moved south-eastwards through the Tongan islands. Early on February 7 after Cyril had moved through Tonga, the JTWC reported that Cyril had peaked with 1-minute windspeeds of 100 km/h (60 mph), which made it equivalent to a tropical storm.

The system subsequently reported later that day that Cyril had become a category 2 tropical cyclone, with 10-minute peak windspeeds of 95 km/h (60 mph). Later that day as the system moved below 25S and out of RSMC Nadi's area of responsibility, Cyril weakened and became a category 1 tropical cyclone. During February 8, Cyril transitioned into an extratropical cyclone and became embedded in the westerlies, before the system was last noted by TCWC Wellington during the next day while located over 3,500 km (2,175 mi) to the northeast of Wellington, New Zealand. Within the Fijian Islands, Cyril caused heavy rain, high seas, strong and gusty winds, before it brought gale-force winds and torrential rain to Tonga. As a result, some flooding and minor damage to vegetation and plantations was reported in parts of the Vava'u group of islands with fruit bearing trees such as breadfruit and banana trees, severely affected.

=== Severe Tropical Cyclone Jasmine ===
- Category 4 severe tropical cyclone (Australian scale)
- Category 4 tropical cyclone (SSHWS)
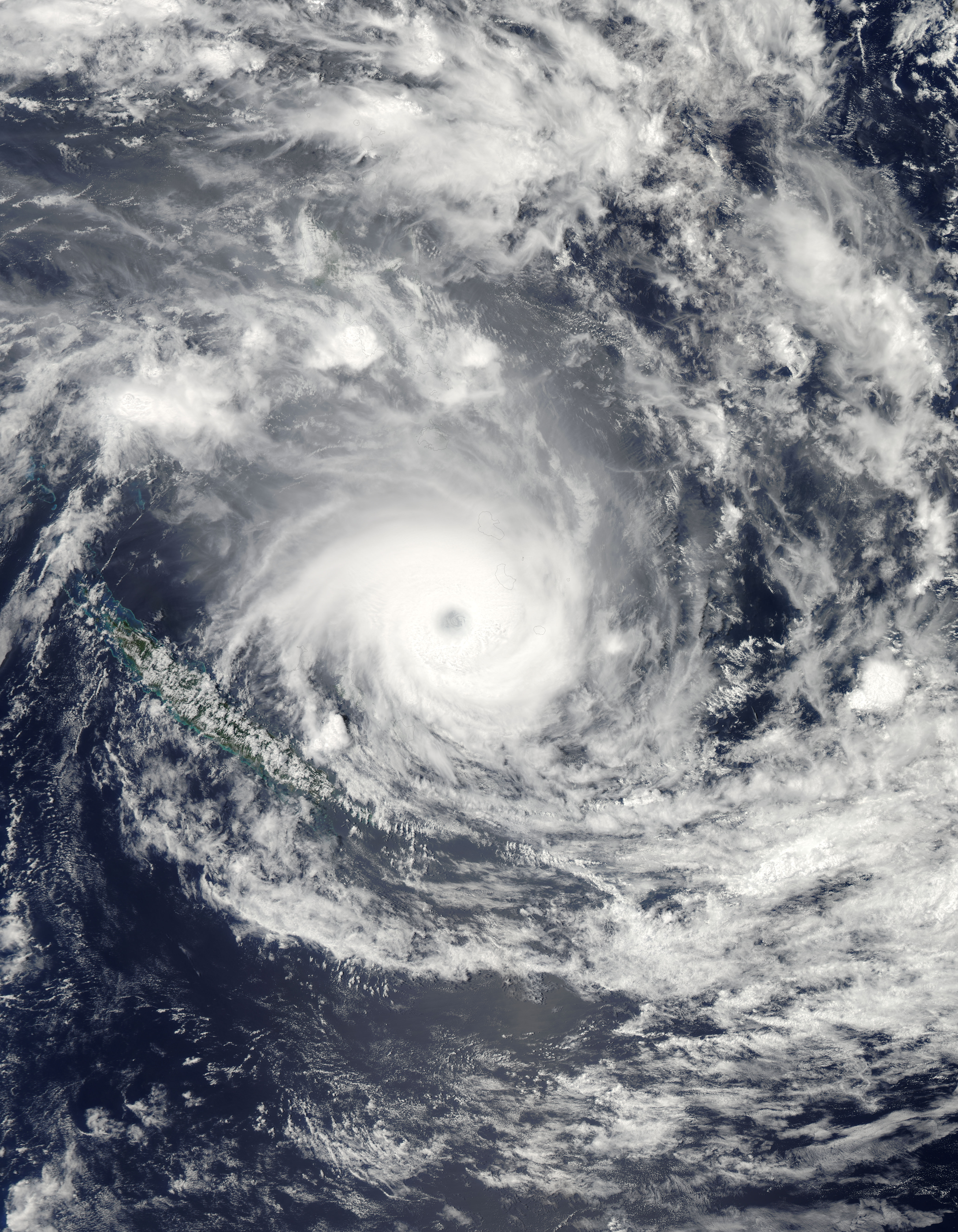
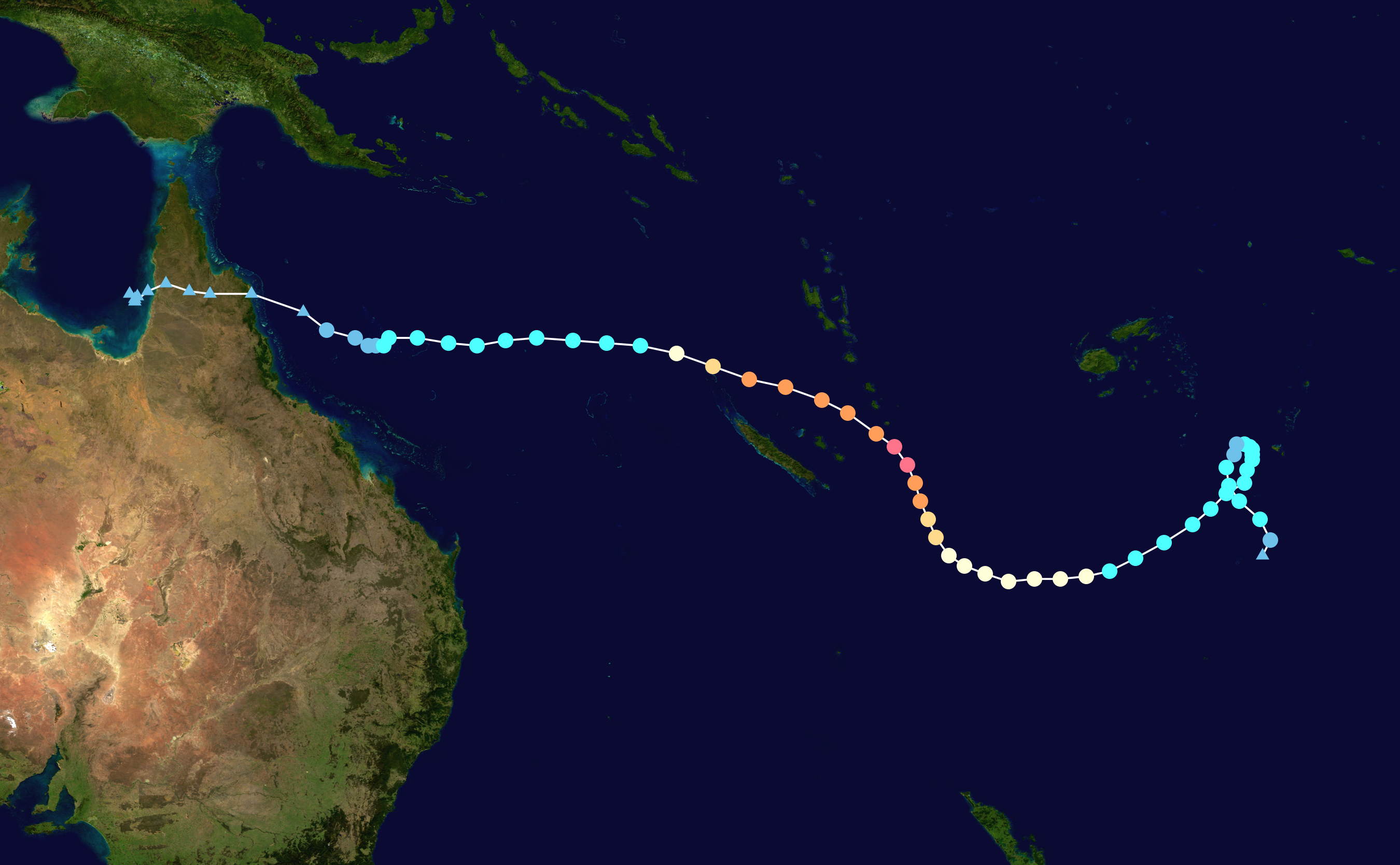
- Duration: February 6 (entered basin) – February 19
- Peak intensity: 195 km/h (120 mph) (10-min); 937 hPa (mbar)

Cyclone Jasmine was a long–lived annular tropical cyclone that affected several countries, particularly Vanuatu and Tonga, over a 19‑day span. Cyclone Jasmine developed from an area of disturbed weather on February 1 in the Gulf of Carpentaria. Initially, the storm moved towards the east and across the Cape York Peninsula. As it moved across the South Pacific, earlier existing wind shear conditions lessened, and Jasmine began to strengthen at a faster rate. Steadily intensifying, Erica reached peak intensity on February 8 as a Category 4 equivalent on the Saffir–Simpson hurricane scale, while beginning to show annular characteristics. The next day Jasmine entered an area of vertical wind shear, which consequently weakened the cyclone and caused its eye to expand. A high-pressure area south of Jasmine later steered the weakening cyclone to the northeast on February 12. Although it entered an area of warmer sea surface temperatures, Jasmine subsequently entered extratropical transition and later degenerated into an extratropical cyclone on February 16, before dissipating completely on February 19.

Cyclone Jasmine affected five countries during its existence. The predecessor to Jasmine brought heavy rainfall to areas of extreme northern Queensland. Jasmine also brought rainfall to areas of the Solomon Islands. As a result, pest infestations occurred across the region. In Vanuatu, heavy rains and wind from Jasmine destroy numerous crops. Banana trees in particular are affected by the cyclone. Cyclone Jasmine inundated areas of Tonga that had already been affected by Cyclone Cyril just a week prior. Nukuʻalofa recorded half of its average monthly rainfall in a 24‑hour span due to rains associated with the cyclone. After the season, the name Jasmine was retired.

=== Tropical Depression 14F ===
- Subtropical depression (SSHWS)
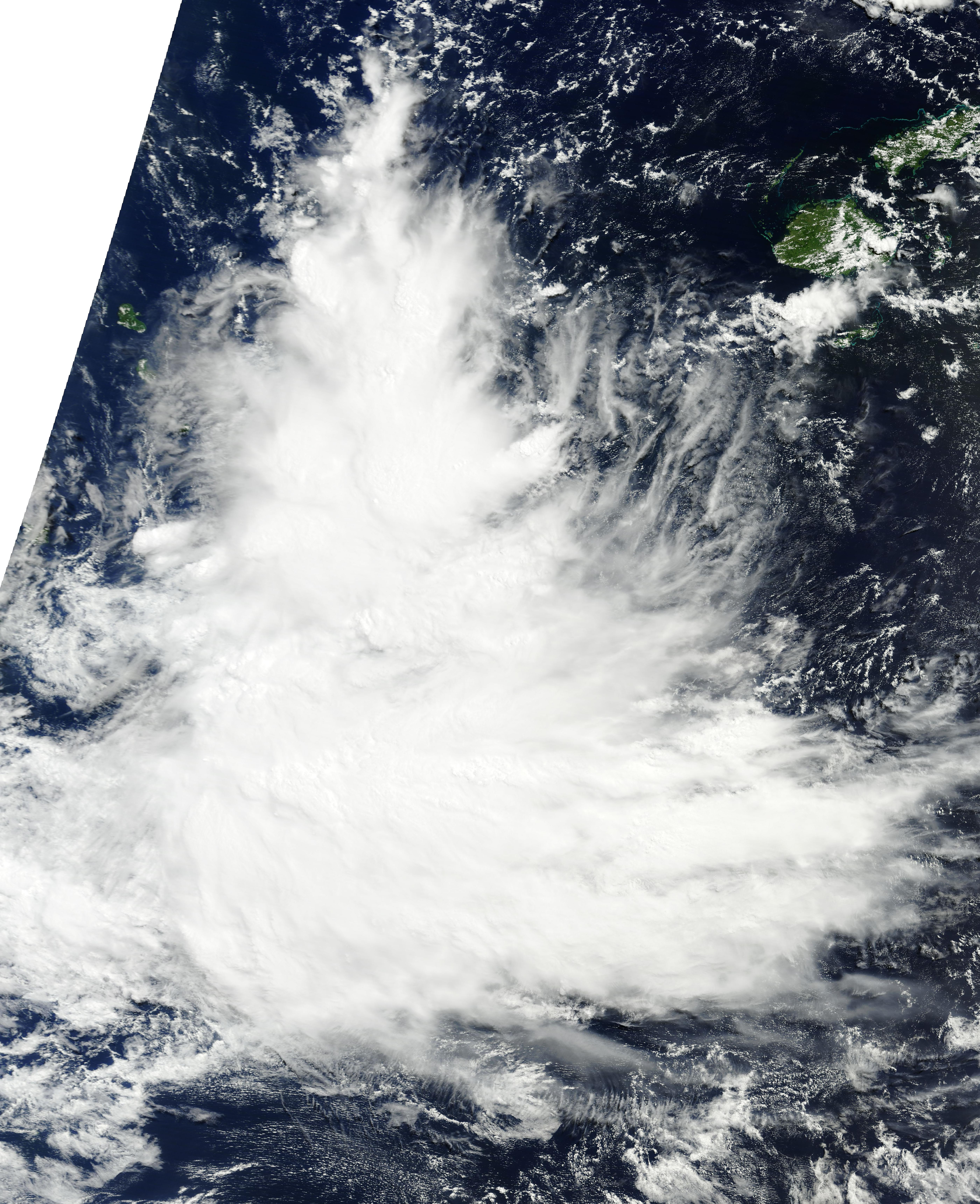
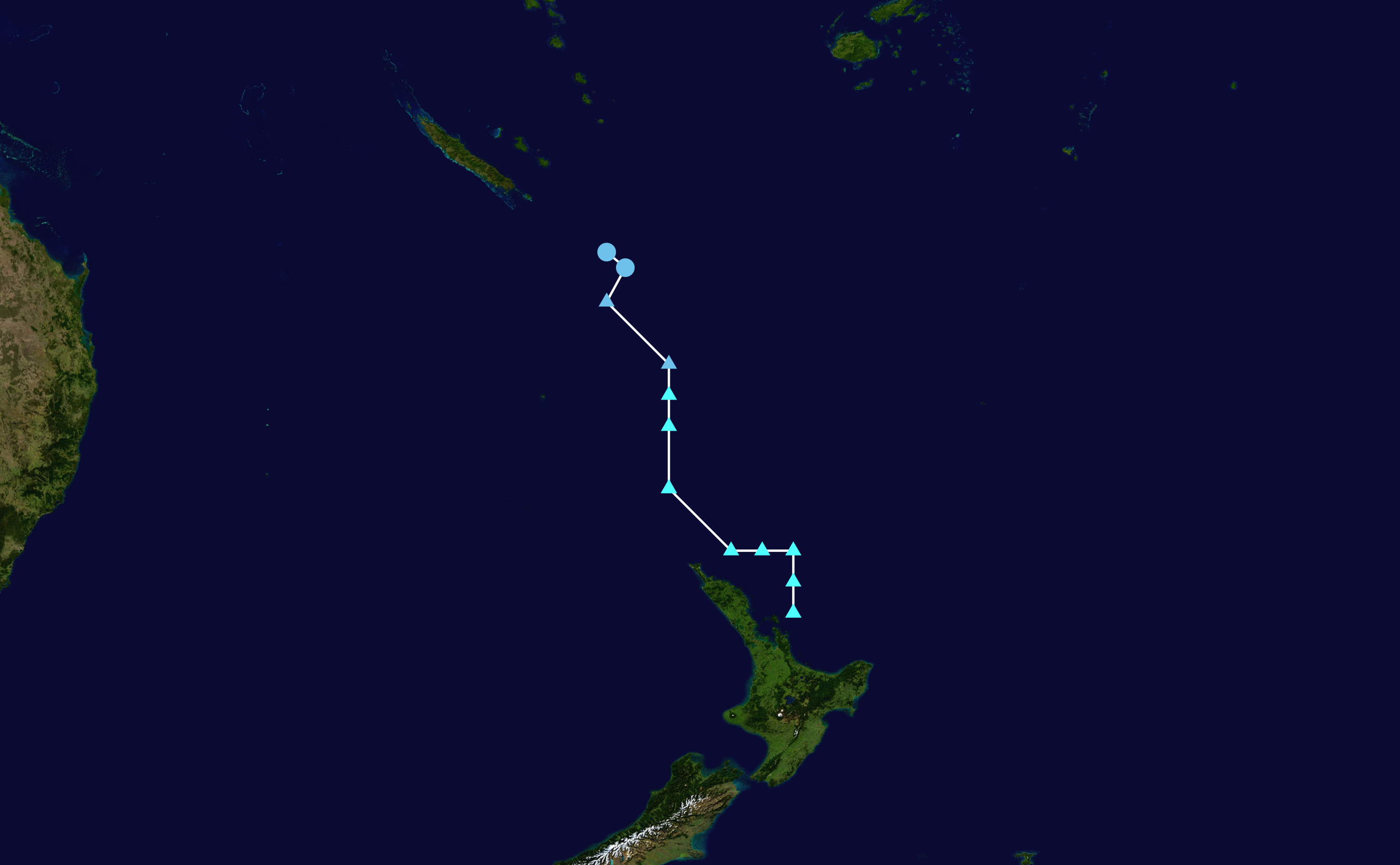
- Duration: March 16 – March 18
- Peak intensity: Winds not specified; 1003 hPa (mbar)

On March 16, RSMC Nadi reported that Tropical Depression 14F had developed about 525 km (325 mi) to the south of Vanuatu's Tanna Island. However, during the next day, it was dropped from RSMC Nadi's warnings as it moved south, into TCWC Wellington's area of responsibility. As the depression left RSMC Nadi's area of responsibility, it degenerated into a subtropical depression, before degenerating further into a deep mid-latitude baroclinic low-pressure system during March 18, as it affected New Zealand's North Island. During 14F's time at New Zealand, the storm killed a total of 5 people.

=== Tropical Depression 17F ===
- Tropical depression (Australian scale)
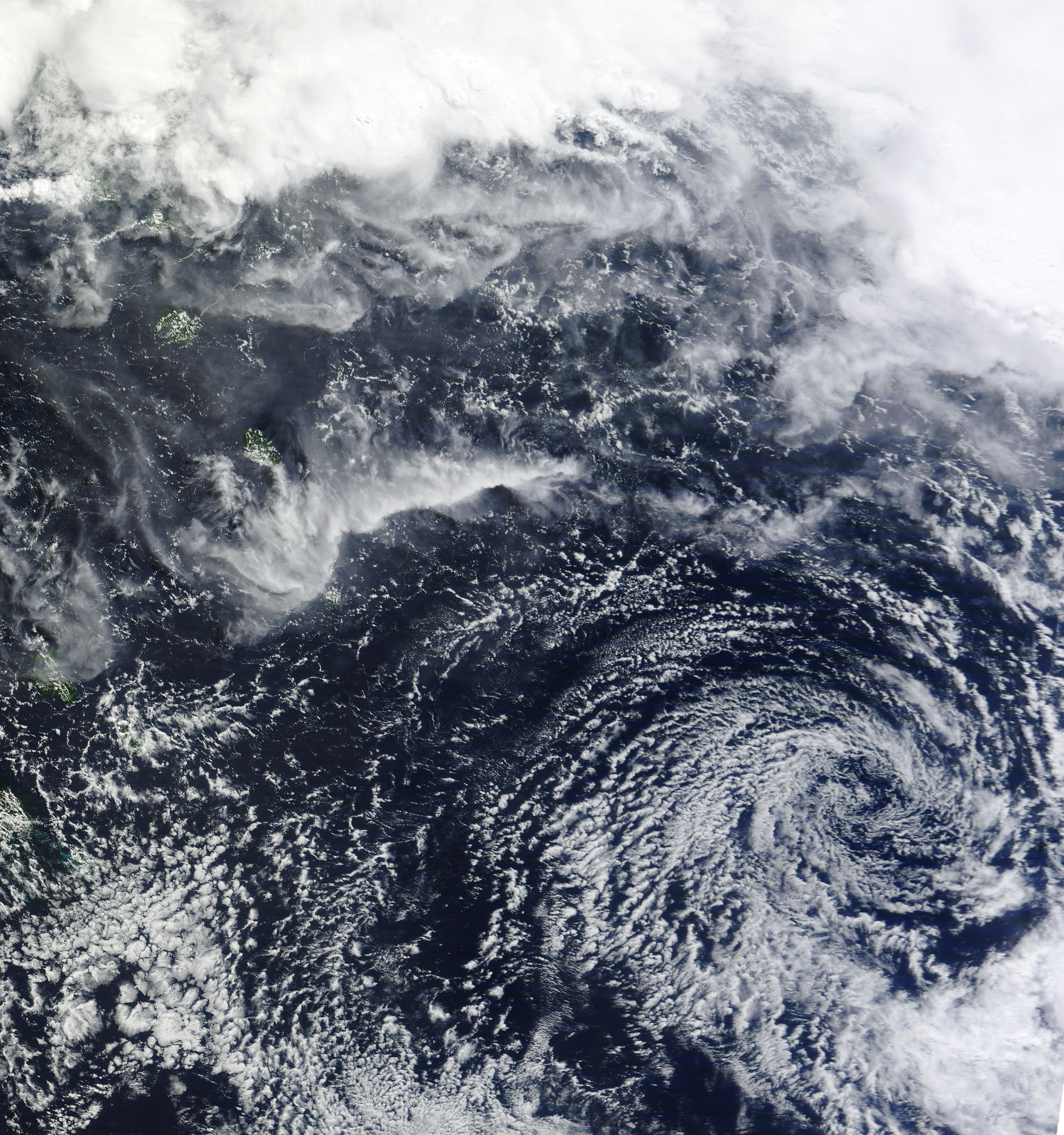
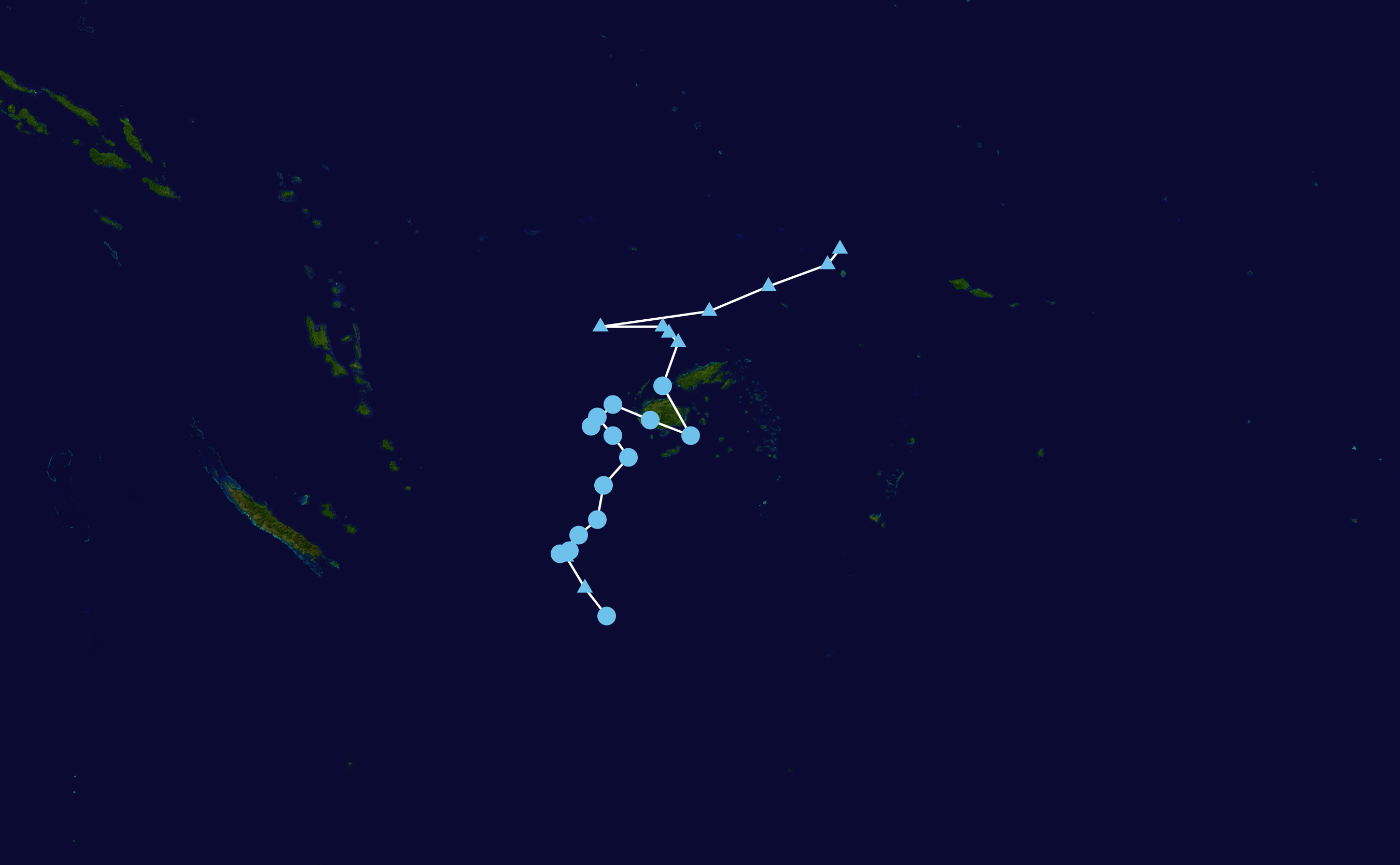
- Duration: March 25 – March 31
- Peak intensity: Winds not specified; 1000 hPa (mbar)

On March 25, RSMC Nadi reported that Tropical Disturbance 17F, had developed within a trough of low pressure about 100 km (60 mi) to the northwest of Rotuma. Over the next few days, the depression moved towards the southwest before it moved on to Northern Fiji during March 28. After moving onto Fiji, 17F rapidly developed further which prompted RSMC Nadi to declare the system a tropical depression.

As the storm rapidly developed further, it triggered widespread rainfall and thunderstorms in Fiji, which led to flooding within Fiji. Within the next few days, 17F slowly left Fiji, with 5 people dead, and slowly moved towards the south. On April 1 the Fijian government announced that at least three people had been killed and almost 4,000 forced into evacuation centers after record floods hit the island nation. The next day these numbers rose to at least five dead and more than 8,000 in evacuation shelters. On March 30, 17F left Fiji, and began moving south-southeastward. Within the next day, Tropical Depression 17F turned to the southwest, and later accelerated towards the southeast again, before dissipating late on March 31.

=== Tropical Cyclone Daphne ===
- Category 2 tropical cyclone (Australian scale)
- Tropical storm (SSHWS)
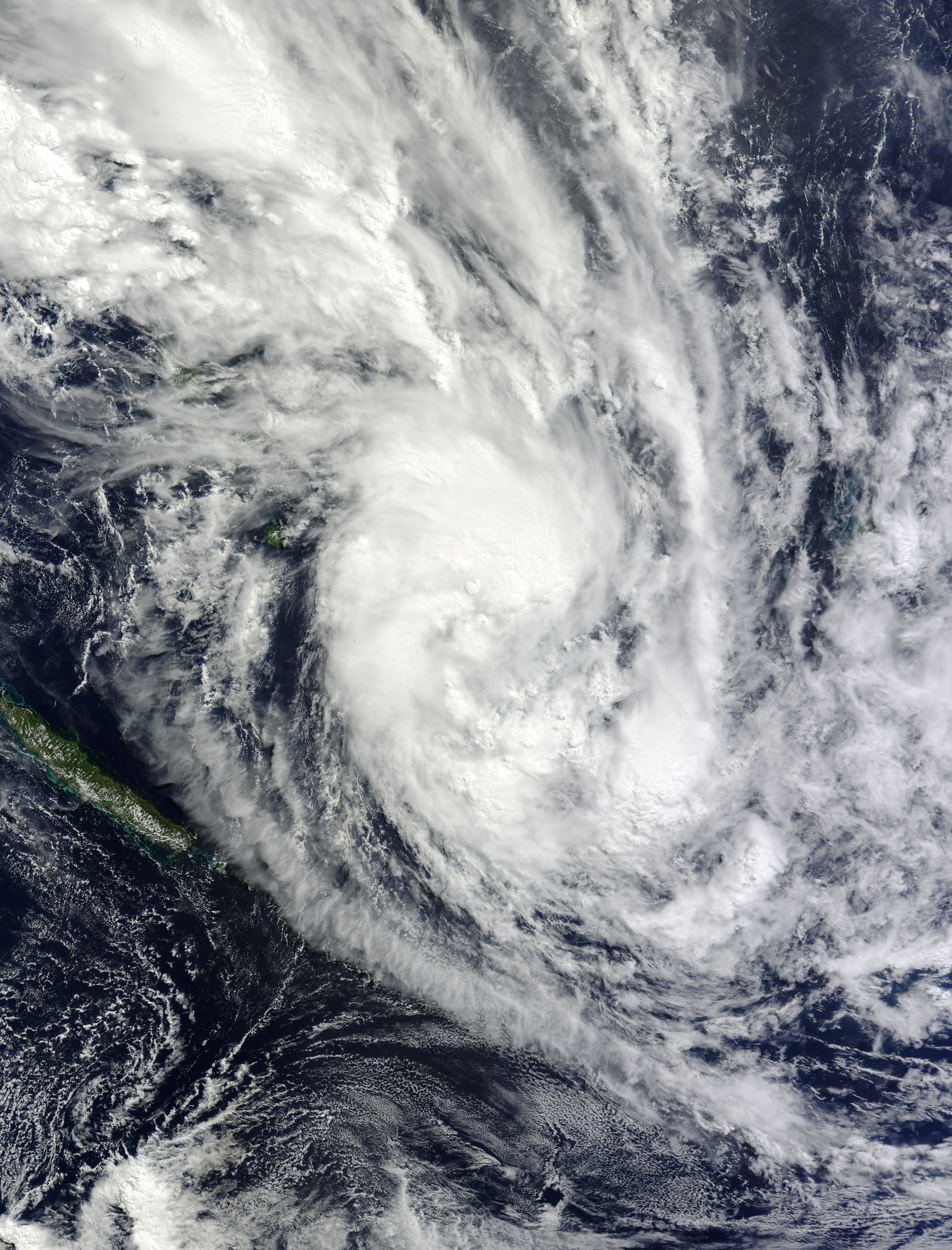
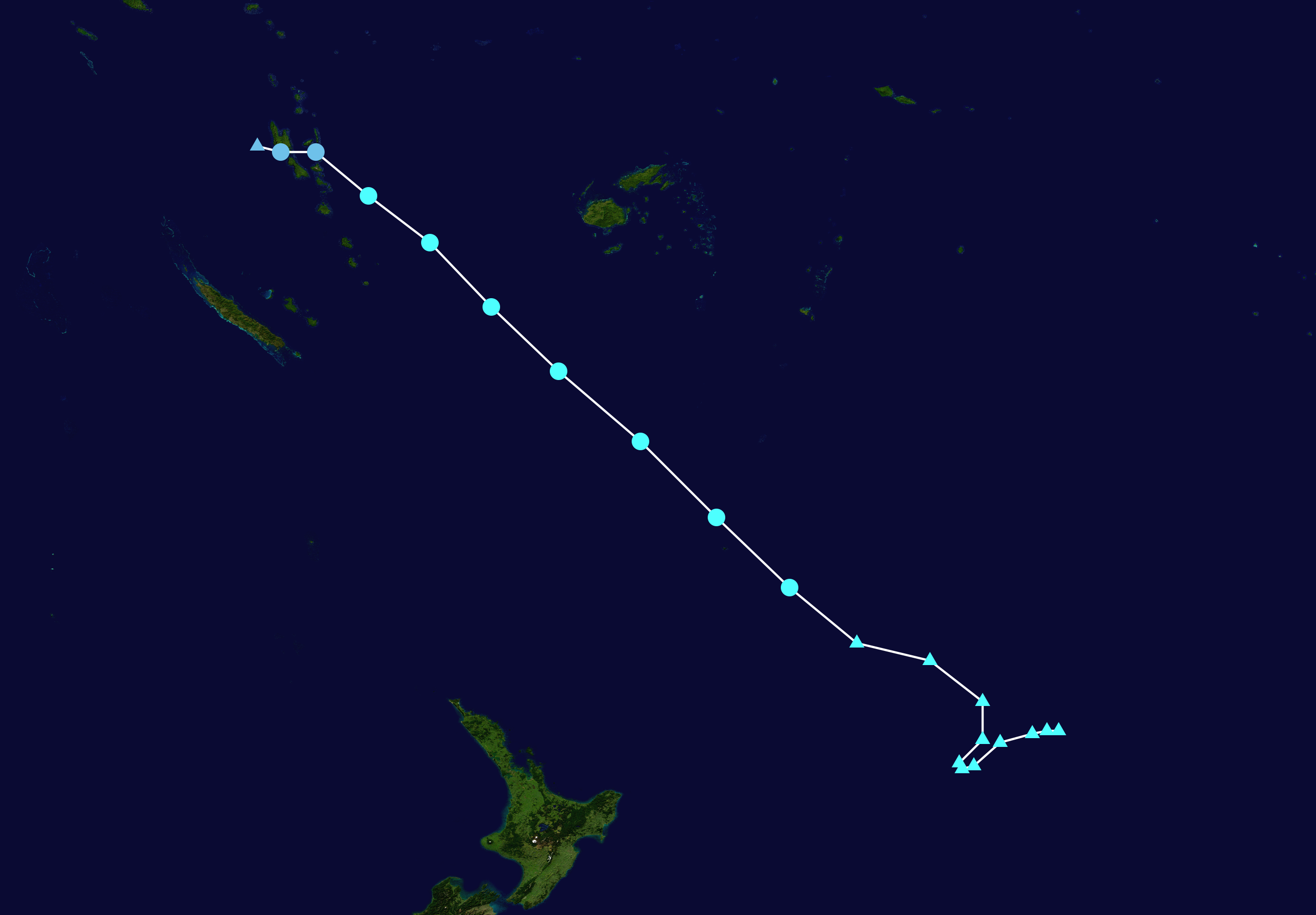
- Duration: March 31 – April 3
- Peak intensity: 100 km/h (65 mph) (10-min); 985 hPa (mbar)

On March 31, RSMC Nadi reported that Tropical Depression 19F had developed about 410 km (255 mi), to the south of Honiara on the Solomon Island of Guadalcanal. This low gradually strengthened and on April 2, it strengthened into a tropical cyclone and RSMC Nadi named it Daphne. Daphne moved southeastwards rapidly and moved into TCWC Wellington's area of responsibility late on April 2.

The system was reclassified as extratropical by MetService during April 3, before they issued their last gale warning on Daphne remnants during April 6. Because of the 2012 Tropical cyclone conference the JTWC did not warn on this system and were operating their continuation of operations plan. As a result, the United States Military's Fleet Weather Center in Norfolk, Virginia, designated the system as Tropical Cyclone 18P and issued warnings using data from the FMS and MetService.

Power to the main island of Viti Levu and Nadi International Airport had been cut as thousands of stranded tourists scrambled to leave for home. Despite not affecting Fiji directly, outer rainbands associated with the system caused strong winds, torrential rain and flooding over Fiji's western division. As a result, five people died and three people were missing while thousands of tourists were stranded as a result.

=== Other systems ===
The following weak tropical disturbances and depressions were also monitored by RSMC Nadi, however all of these systems were either short lived or did not develop significantly.

Early on February 14, Tropical Depression 13F developed within an area of low vertical windshear about 850 km (530 mi) to the northwest of Nouméa, New Caledonia. During that day the depression moved towards the east-southeast, before during the next day it slowly moved towards the west-southwest. The final advisory on Tropical Depression 13F was then issued on February 17, as the depression was moving into the Australian region and was not expected to develop into a tropical cyclone.

Tropical Disturbance 15F developed in an area of moderate to high vertical windshear during March 19, about 580 km (360 mi) to the northwest of Nouméa, New Caledonia. During that day, the system moved towards the southeast before it was last noted during the next day as it moved into the subtropics and MetService's area of responsibility. Tropical Disturbance 16F developed along a surface trough of low pressure, to the northwest of Wallis and Futuna, in an area of weak vertical wind shear during March 22. Over the next few days the system moved southwards and did not develop any further before it was last noted during March 26.

Tropical Depression 18F developed within an area of high to moderate vertical wind shear during March 30, while it was located about 200 km (125 mi) to the northeast of Port Vila, Vanuatu. Over the next day the system moved south-eastwards, before it was last noted during March 31, while it was located about 185 km (115 mi) to the south-east of Port Villa, Vanuatu. The twentieth and final tropical disturbance of the season was first noted during April 9, while it was located to the south of an upper-level ridge of high pressure about 435 km (270 mi) to the north-west of Nouméa, New Caledonia. During that day the system slightly organised further as it moved south-eastwards, between New Caledonia's Loyalty and Grande Terre islands, before it was declared to be a tropical depression during April 10. The system was subsequently last noted during the next day, as it weakened and moved out of the tropics.

== Storm names ==
Within the Southern Pacific a tropical depression is judged to have reached tropical cyclone intensity should it reach winds of 65 km/h (40 mph) and it is evident that gales are occurring at least halfway around the center. Tropical depressions that intensify into a tropical cyclone between the Equator and 25°S and between 160°E and 120°W are named by the FMS. However, should a tropical depression intensify to the south of 25°S between 160°E and 120°W it will be named by MetService in conjunction with the FMS. If a tropical cyclone moves out of the basin and into the Australian region, it will retain its original name. The name Daphne would be used for the first (and only) time this year, after replacing the name Drena after the 1996-97 season. The names that were used for the 2011-12 season are listed below:

- Cyril
- Daphne

If a tropical cyclone enters the South Pacific basin from the Australian region basin (west of 160°E), it will retain the name assigned to it by the Australian Bureau of Meteorology. The following storms were named in this manner:

- Jasmine

=== Retirement ===
No names were retired after this season, however, in 2023, the name Daphne was replaced with Danial. Additionally, while not forming in the basin, the name Jasmine was retired and replaced with Jenna.

== Season effects ==
This table lists all the storms that developed in the South Pacific to the east of longitude 160°E during the 2011–2012 season. It includes their intensity on the Australian Tropical cyclone intensity scale, duration, name, landfalls, deaths, and damages. All data is taken from RSMC Nadi and/or TCWC Wellington, and all of the damage figures are in 2012 USD.

Name	Dates	Peak intensity			Areas affected	Damage (USD)	Deaths	Ref(s).
Name	Dates	Category	Wind speed	Pressure	Areas affected	Damage (USD)	Deaths	Ref(s).
01F	November 13–16	Tropical disturbance	Not specified	1,004 hPa (29.65 inHg)	Fiji		None	
02F	December 28 – January 1	Tropical depression	Not specified	1,002 hPa (29.59 inHg)	Niue, Cook Islands	None	None	
03F	January 7–8	Tropical disturbance	Not specified	1,001 hPa (29.56 inHg)	Tonga	None	None	
04F	January 8–9	Tropical depression	Not specified	1,000 hPa (29.53 inHg)	French Polynesia	None	None	
05F	January 8–10	Tropical disturbance	Not specified	1,000 hPa (29.53 inHg)	Niue	None	None	
06F	January 20–24	Tropical depression	Not specified	1,001 hPa (29.56 inHg)	Fiji	17.2 million	8	
07F	January 26 – February 2	Tropical depression	55 km/h (35 mph)	994 hPa (29.35 inHg)	Vanuatu, Fiji, New Caledonia	None	None	
08F	January 25–28	Tropical depression	Not specified	1,001 hPa (29.56 inHg)	Fiji	None	None	
09F	January 30–31	Tropical depression	55 km/h (35 mph)	998 hPa (29.47 inHg)	Vanuatu, Fiji	None	None	
10F	February 2–6	Tropical depression	35 km/h (20 mph)	991 hPa (29.26 inHg)	Vanuatu, New Caledonia, Fiji, Tonga	None	None	
Cyril	February 5–8	Category 2 tropical cyclone	95 km/h (60 mph)	985 hPa (29.09 inHg)	Fiji, Tonga	Minor	None	
Jasmine	February 6–19	Category 4 severe tropical cyclone	195 km/h (120 mph)	937 hPa (27.67 inHg)	Solomon Islands, Vanuatu; New Caledonia, Tonga	None	None	
13F	February 13–17	Tropical depression	Not specified	1,005 hPa (29.68 inHg)	New Caledonia, Vanuatu	None	None	
14F	March 16–18	Tropical depression	Not specified	1,005 hPa (29.68 inHg)	New Zealand		5	
15F	March 19–20	Tropical disturbance	Not specified	1,004 hPa (29.65 inHg)	New Caledonia	None	None	
16F	March 22–27	Tropical disturbance	Not specified	1,003 hPa (29.62 inHg)	Wallis and Futuna, Fiji			
17F	March 25–30	Tropical depression	Not specified	1,000 hPa (29.53 inHg)	Fiji			
18F	March 30–31	Tropical depression	Not specified	1,004 hPa (29.65 inHg)	Vanuatu			
Daphne	March 31 – April 3	Category 2 tropical cyclone	100 km/h (60 mph)	985 hPa (29.09 inHg)	Vanuatu, Fiji		5	
20F	April 9–11	Tropical depression	Not specified	1,009 hPa (29.80 inHg)	New Caledonia	None	None	
Season aggregates
20 systems	November 13 – April 11		185 km/h (115 mph)	942 hPa (27.82 inHg)		>17.2 million	18	

== See also ==
- Tropical cyclones in 2011 and 2012
- Atlantic hurricane seasons: 2011, 2012
- Pacific hurricane seasons: 2011, 2012
- Pacific typhoon seasons: 2011, 2012
- North Indian Ocean cyclone seasons: 2011, 2012
